= Transparency and Targeting of Political Advertising Regulation =

EU regulation governing transparency and targeting of political advertising

Regulation (EU) 2024/900
- European Union regulation
- Text with EEA relevance
- Title: Regulation (EU) 2024/900 of the European Parliament and of the Council of 13 March 2024 on the transparency and targeting of political advertising
- Made by: European Parliament and Council of the European Union
- Made under: Art. 16 and 114 TFEU
- Journal reference: OJ L, 2024/900, 20.3.2024

History
- European Parliament vote: 27 February 2024
- Council Vote: 11 March 2024
- Date made: 13 March 2024
- Entry into force: 9 April 2024
- Applies from: 10 October 2025 (most provisions); 10 April 2026 (repository)

Regulation (EU) 2024/900, commonly known as Transparency and Targeting of Political Advertising or Political Advertising Regulation, is a European Union regulation adopted in March 2024 that introduces harmonised rules for transparency and targeting in political advertising across all EU member states.

The regulation complements the Digital Services Act, General Data Protection Regulation (GDPR), and the EU Code of Practice on Disinformation. It responds to increasing concerns about the influence of microtargeting in elections, especially by third-country actors.

== Scope and definitions ==
The regulation broadly defines political advertising to include the preparation, placement, promotion, delivery, or dissemination of messages that are:

- By, for, or on behalf of political actors,
- Or designed to influence the outcome of elections, referendums or legislative/regulatory processes.

Covered actors include political parties, campaign organisations, elected officials, and issue-based groups. Even civil society campaigns are affected if they relate to political or legislative outcomes.

== Key provisions ==
The regulation introduces the following core obligations:

=== Transparency and labelling ===
- Political ads must include a clear label and link to a transparency notice.
- The notice must disclose the sponsor, purpose, amount paid, targeting criteria used, and associated electoral or policy event.

=== Targeting restrictions ===
- Targeting based on special categories of personal data (e.g. political opinions, ethnicity, health) is prohibited.
- Ads cannot be targeted to individuals under voting age or within one year of eligibility.

=== Third-country restrictions ===
- In the three months before elections or referendums, providers can only offer political advertising services to EU-based entities not controlled by foreign interests.

=== Record-keeping and compliance ===
- Advertisers and intermediaries must retain key documentation (e.g. sponsor identity, payment info, service scope) for seven years.
- Content creators, platforms, and ad tech providers share liability and must set up contractual arrangements to clarify responsibilities.

=== Repository for political ads ===
A European repository for online political advertisements will include metadata standards, authentication protocols, APIs for third-party access, and allow stakeholders (e.g. journalists, researchers, civil society) to request machine-readable data from providers under Article 17.

== Implementation timeline ==
- 13 March 2024: Regulation adopted by the Parliament and Council.
- 20 March 2024: Regulation published in the Official Journal of the European Union.
- 9 April 2024: Regulation enters into force and non-discrimination obligation on providers of political advertising services begins to apply.
- 10 July 2025: The Commission shall adopt implementing acts on technical details of labelling and transparency of political advertisements by this date.
- 10 October 2025: Most obligations of the regulation become applicable.
- 10 April 2026: The Commission shall adopt implementing acts on technical details of the European repository for online political advertisements by this date.

== Reactions ==
=== Withdrawals from advertising platforms ===
Google announced its exit from the EU political ad market in late 2024, highlighting the regulation’s broad scope and lack of reliable electoral data.

Meta Platforms announced that it will suspend all political and issue-based ads on its platforms in the EU from October 2025, citing "legal uncertainty" and "operational challenges".

=== Civil society concerns ===
Critics argue the regulation risks conflating civil society with political parties, placing excessive burdens on NGOs, grassroots campaigns, and issue-driven communication. Groups have warned this may chill speech on topics like abortion or domestic violence when connected to legislative processes.

Observers have flagged issues including, overly broad definitions of "political advertising", lack of technical guidance ahead of enforcement, disproportionate impacts on small and medium enterprises, risk of democratic distortion due to reliance on dominant platforms like Meta.
