= Russian 2019 fake news laws =

Russian law

2019 Fake News Law

Federal Assembly
- Long title: On Amendments to Article 15-3 of the Federal Law "On Information, Information Technologies and Information Protection" On Amendments to the Code of the Russian Federation on Administrative Offenses
- Territorial extent: Russia
- Signed by: President Vladimir Putin
- Signed: 18 March 2019
- Commenced: 19 March 2019

Legislative history
- First reading: 7 March 2019 (State Duma)
- Second reading: 13 March 2019 (Federation Council)

Amends
- Code of the Russian Federation on Administrative Offenses
- Status: Current legislation

The Russian 2019 fake news laws is a group of 2 federal laws, adopted by State Duma on 7 March 2019, approved by Federation Council on 13 March 2019, signed by President of Russia on 18 March 2019, allowing the Federal Service for Supervision of Communications, Information Technology and Mass Media to extrajudicially block access to online media publishing information, considered "unreliable" by Russian authorities (Law No.31-FZ), and establishing the punishment for such dissemination (Law No.27-FZ). The laws entered into force on 29 March 2019. These laws are the first in the series of Russian fake news laws.

== Overview ==
The Federal Law of 18 March 2019 No.31-FZ prohibits the dissemination of an "unreliable information" endangering life and/or health of individuals, and/or property, creating the risk of massive violation of public order and/or public security, or the risk of interference with the functioning of vital, transport, social infrastructure, power, industrial and communication facilities, banks and other financial institutions.

The Federal Law of 18 March 2019 No.27-FZ supplemented the article 13.15 of the Code of the Russian Federation on Administrative Offenses with parts 9, 10 and 11 providing huge administrative fines for natural persons and juridical persons for the dissemination of "unreliable information".

According to aforementioned laws, an online media is obliged to remove from its website the information designated as "unreliable" by Roskomnadzor immediately after receiving the relevant notification. In the case of non-compliance with the obligation, Roskomnadzor blocks access to the media's website. Administrative responsibility is incurred even in the case of compliance with the obligation.

== Application of law ==
The first case of dissemination of "unreliable information" was opened in April 2019 against Arkhangelsk's resident Elena Kalinina.

The first persons who were convicted under the Fake News Law are Publishing House "Moment Istiny" and its editor-in-chief Evgeniy Gneushev. The district court overturned the judgement against Publishing House "Moment Istiny" and set the case for a new consideration, but magistrate court imposed a fine again.

== Reaction ==
The Presidential Council for Civil Society and Human Rights opposed the bill.

On 12 March 2019, many journalists and human rights defenders stated that the bill would establish the government censorship which is prohibited by the Constitution of Russia. They called this law grave abuse by officials, cynical denial of constitutional rights, state repressions against journalist community.

== See also ==
- Russian fake news laws
