= Russian 2019 Disrespect to Authorities Law =

2019 Disrespect to Authorities Law

Federal Assembly
- Long title: On Amendments to the Federal Law ‘On Information, Information Technologies and Information Protection’ On amendments to the Code of the Russian Federation on Administrative Offenses
- Territorial extent: Russia
- Signed by: President Vladimir Putin
- Signed: 18 March 2019
- Commenced: 29 March 2019

Legislative history
- First reading: 7 March 2019 (State Duma)
- Second reading: 13 March 2019 (Federation Council)

Amends
- Federal Law ‘On Information, Information Technologies and Information Protection’ Code of the Russian Federation on Administrative Offenses
- Status: Current legislation

The 2019 Russian Disrespect to Authorities Law is a group of 2 federal laws, adopted by State Duma on 7 March 2019, approved by Federation Council on 13 March 2019, signed by President of Russia on 18 March 2019, allowing the Federal Service for Supervision of Communications, Information Technology and Mass Media to extrajudicially block access to online sources containing the "blatant disrespect" for the state, the authorities, the society, the state symbols, the Constitution (Law No.30-FZ), and establishing the punishment for the dissemination of an information containing such "blatant disrespect" (Law No.28-FZ). The laws entered into force on 29 March 2019.

== Overview ==
The Federal Law of 18 March 2019 No.30-FZ prohibits the dissemination of an information containing the "blatant disrespect" for the Russian state, the Russian authorities, the Russian society, the Russian state symbols, the Constitution of Russia.

The Federal Law of 18 March 2019 No.28-FZ supplemented the article 20.1 of the Code of the Russian Federation on Administrative Offenses with parts 3, 4 and 5 providing huge administrative fines for natural persons and juridical persons and imprisonment for up to 15 days for the dissemination of an information containing the "blatant disrespect" for the Russian state, the Russian authorities, the Russian society, the Russian state symbols, the Constitution of Russia.

According to aforementioned laws, an online resource is obliged to remove the information designated as "containing the blatant disrespect for the Russian state, the Russian authorities, the Russian society, the Russian state symbols, the Constitution of Russia" by Roskomnadzor immediately after receiving the relevant notification. In the case of non-compliance with the obligation, Roskomnadzor blocks access to the online resource. Administrative responsibility is incurred even in the case of compliance with the obligation.

== Application of law ==
The first person who was sentenced under the Disrespect to Authorities Law is the citizen of Novgorod Oblast Yuriy Kartyzhev who called Vladimir Putin 'fairy-tale fuckhead' in social media.

For the first year of existence of the law, Russian courts pronounced 51 conviction judgments, 38 of which were related to "disrespect" to Vladimir Putin personally. In opinion of Pavel Chikov, the chair of the Inter-regional Association of Human Rights Organizations "Agora", "the Disrespect to Authorities Law is actually the Insulting the President Law".

== Reaction ==
The Presidential Council for Civil Society and Human Rights opposed the bill.

On 12 March 2019, many journalists and human rights defenders stated that the bill would establish the government censorship which is prohibited by the Constitution of Russia. They called this law grave abuse by officials, cynical denial of constitutional rights, state repressions against journalist community.

== See also ==
- Russian fake news laws
