= Code of the Russian Federation on Administrative Offenses =

The Code of the Russian Federation on Administrative Offenses (Russian: Кодекс Российской Федерации об административных правонарушениях, frequently abbreviated КоАП РФ) is the administrative offenses law for Russia. The Code of Administrative Offenses of the Russian Federation was adopted on December 30, 2001. The Code serves as a comprehensive legal act to set the forms and extent of liability for a certain category of violations of law in various aspects of Russian law. This includes tax, currency, labor and antimonopoly legislation. According to the Russian law, an administrative offense is "An unlawful, guilty action (inaction) of an individual or legal entity for which this Code or the laws of the constituent entities of the Russian Federation on administrative offenses establishes administrative liability."

== Content ==
Under Part 1 of Art. 1.1 Code of the Russian Federation on Administrative Violations, the Russian legislation on administrative offenses consist of this Code and the Codes adopted in accordance with this Code. That is, in the territory of individual subjects of the Russian Federation local Codes can be installed and administrative penalties for acts that are not listed in the Russian Federation Code of Administrative Offences.

Laws of subjects of the Russian Federation on Administrative Violations:

- Law of the Republic of Adygea on Administrative Offences (the current version of the company's website "Consultant Plus" access limited hours)
- Altai Republic Act on Administrative Offences (the current version of the company's website "Consultant Plus" access limited hours)
- Code of the Republic of Bashkortostan on Administrative Offences (the current version of the company's website "Consultant Plus" access limited hours)
- Law of the Republic of Buryatia of Administrative Offences (the current version of the company's website "Consultant Plus" access limited hours)
- Krasnodar Region Law on Administrative Offences (as amended on 10.2.2013 as amended. & Accessories. Coming into force from 14.10.2013 on the website of "Consultant Plus" (access limited hours)
- Volgograd Region Code of Administrative Offences (current version on the site of the Volgograd Regional Duma)
- Tomsk Region Code of Administrative Offences (current version on the site Duma of Tomsk Oblast)
- Law of the Rostov region of Administrative Offences (current version on the official portal of the Government of the Rostov region)
- Code of the Republic of Bashkortostan on administrative offenses
  - Violation of the regulations of the Republic of Bashkortostan on the use of languages of the Republic of Bashkortostan when placing road signs, names (names) of settlements, streets - shall entail the imposition of an administrative fine on officials in the amount of three thousand to five thousand rubles; for legal entities - from eight thousand to ten thousand (Article 2.3 of the Code of the Republic of Bashkortostan on administrative offenses, Law on the language of the people of the Republic of Bashkortostan).

== See also ==
- Law of the Russian Federation
- Russian Criminal Code
