= EU Code of Practice on Disinformation =

2018 industry self-regulation agreement

In 2018, the European Commission convened representatives of major technology firms and the online advertising industry to develop a voluntary framework of industry self-regulation to fight disinformation. In the aftermath of the Facebook-Cambridge Analytica scandal and Russian interference in the 2016 U.S. presidential election, the Commission expressed concern that "mass online disinformation campaigns" were being "widely used by a range of domestic and foreign actors to sow distrust and create societal tensions." Moreover, the online platforms where these campaigns take place, according to the commission, had "failed to act proportionately, falling short of the challenge posed by disinformation and the manipulative use of platforms' infrastructures."

The Code sets out a definition of disinformation as well as five broad commitments for industry signatories. Signatories commit to prepare annual self-assessment reports for review by the European Commission.

== Definition of Disinformation ==
The Code defines disinformation as "verifiably false or misleading information which, cumulatively,

- (a) Is created, presented and disseminated for economic gain or to intentionally deceive the public; and
- (b) May cause public harm, intended as threats to democratic political and policymaking processes as well as public goods such as the protection of EU citizens' health, the environment or security."

The Code recognizes that the definition of disinformation excludes "misleading advertising, reporting errors, satire and parody, or clearly identified partisan news and commentary."

== Commitments ==
The Code sets out five broad commitments for industry signatories and allows for flexible uptake. Signatories may select which commitments they will adhere to depending on the nature of their services and their technical capabilities.

=== Scrutiny of Ad Placements ===
Signatories acknowledge the need to "significantly improve the scrutiny of advertisement placements, notably in order to reduce revenues of the purveyors of disinformation."

=== Political Advertising and Issue-Based Advertising ===
Broadly, signatories "acknowledge the [European Commission's] call to recognise the importance of ensuring transparency about political and issue-based advertising."

=== Integrity of Services ===
Signatories recognize "the importance of intensifying and demonstrating the effectiveness of efforts to close fake accounts as well as the importance of establishing clear marking systems and rules for bots to ensure their activities cannot be confused with human interactions."

=== Empowering Consumers ===
Signatories commit to "invest in technological means to prioritize relevant, authentic, and authoritative information where appropriate in search, feeds, or other automatically ranked distribution channels."

=== Empowering the Research Community ===
Broadly, signatories "commit to support good faith independent efforts to track disinformation and understand its impact."

== Signatories ==
- Facebook (2018)
- Google (2018)
- Twitter (2018)
- Mozilla (2018)
- Association des agences conseils en communication (AACC) (2018)
- European Association of Communications Agencies (EACA) (2018)
- EDiMA (2018)
- Interactive Advertising Bureau Europe (2018)
- Union of Belgian Advertisers (UBA) (2018)
- World Federation of Advertisers (WFA) (2018)
- AKA (2018)
- Microsoft (2019)
- SAR Marketing Communication Association (2019)
- TikTok (2020)
- Goldbach Audience (2020)
- Kreativitet & Kommunikation (2020)

== See also ==
- Transparency and targeting of political advertising
