= Carlton House desk =

Antique desk form

A Carlton House desk is a specific antique desk form within the more general bureau à gradin form. This form of desk is supposed to have been designed in the 18th century for the Prince of Wales (who later became George IV) by George Hepplewhite. It is named after Carlton House, which was at the time the London residence of the Prince, and sometimes is also known as a Carlton House writing table.

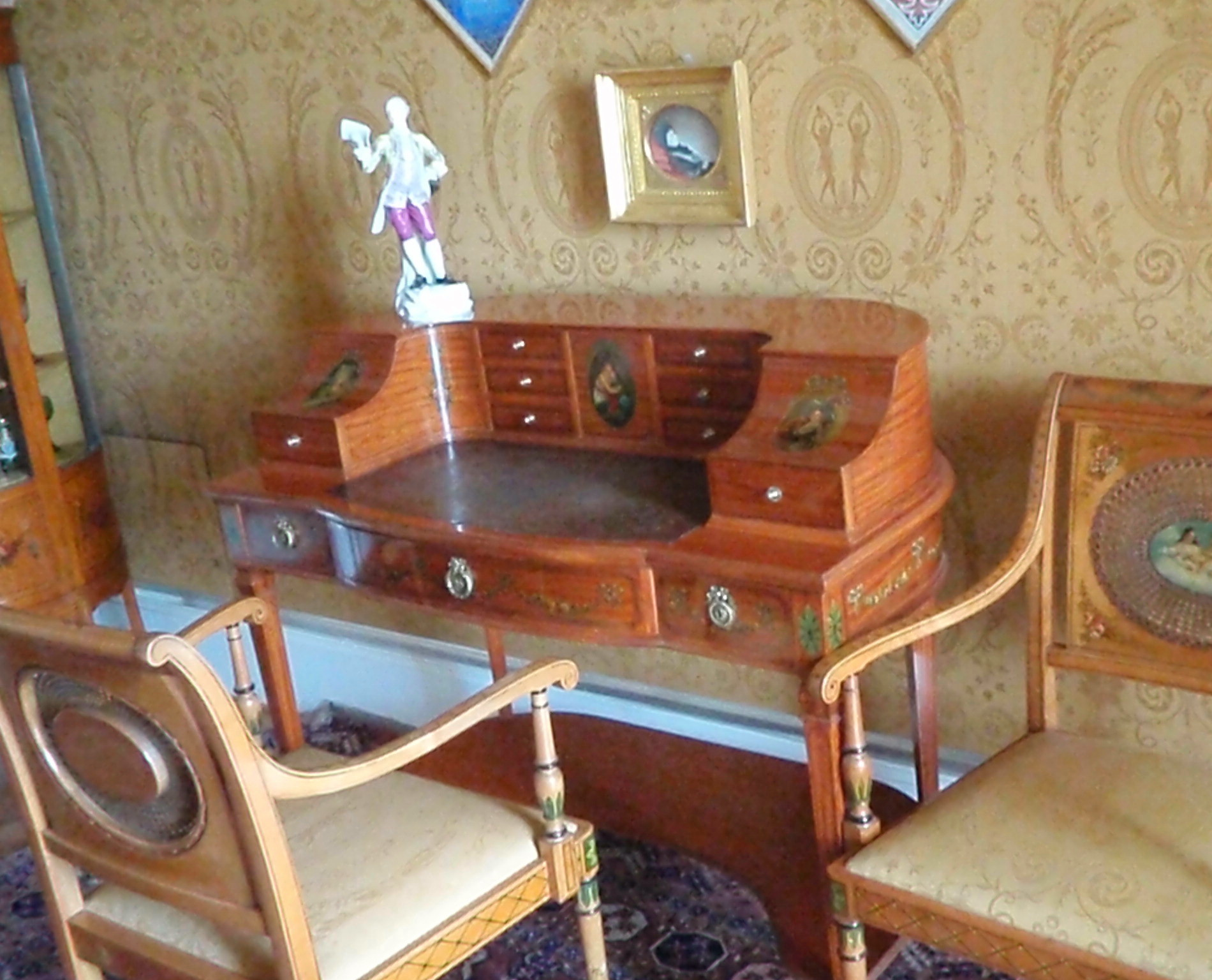
A richly decorated Carlton House desk

The desk resembles a normal writing table, but small drawers above the surface form a "U" shape around the user, instead of merely facing the user as in a typical bureau à gradin. Unlike other types of bureau à gradin, the Carlton House desk usually offers no pigeonholes. There are usually small slopes over each of the desktop drawers at the left and right ends of the "U" shape. Drawings of this type of desk were presented by Hepplewhite in his noted design book, the Cabinet-Maker and Upholsterer's Guide, and by Thomas Sheraton in his own book of designs, The Cabinet Maker and Upholsterer's Drawing Book, thus ensuring its popularity.

== See also ==
List of desk forms and types

== Bibliography ==
- Aronson, Joseph. The Encyclopedia of Furniture. 3rd ed. New York: Crown Publishers, 1966.
- Gloag, John. A Complete Dictionary of Furniture. Woodstock, N.Y. : Overlook Press, 1991.
- Nickerson, David. English Furniture of the Eighteenth Century. London: Weidenfeld and Nicolson, 1963.
