= Lyre arm =

Design motif emulating the shape of a lyre

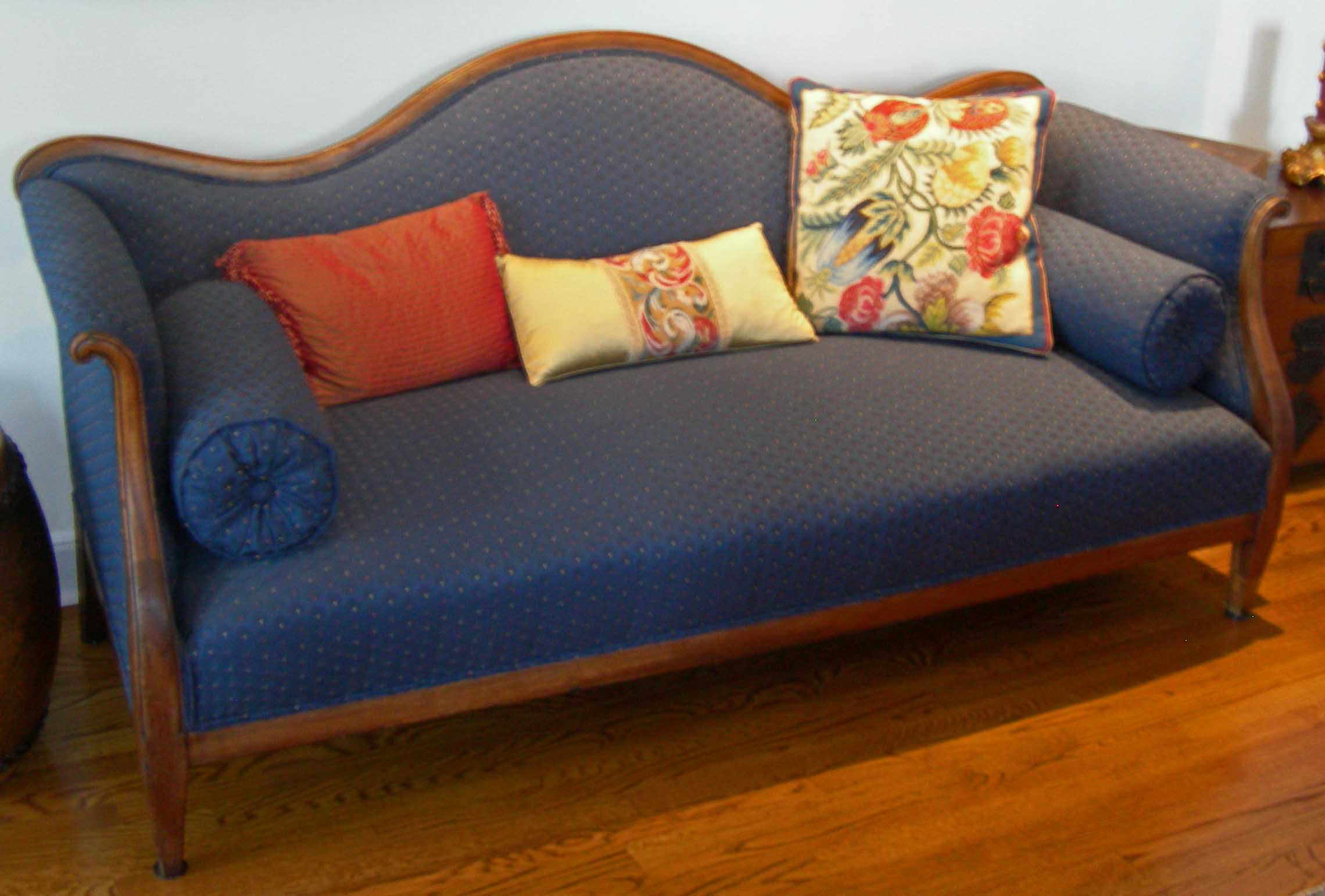
American Federal Period sofa with lyre arm design circa 1790

A lyre arm is an element of design in furniture, architecture and the decorative arts, wherein a shape is employed to emulate the geometry of a lyre; the original design of this element is from the Classical Greek period, simply reflecting the stylistic design of the musical instrument. One of the earliest uses extant of the lyre design in the Christian era is a 6th-century AD gravestone with lyre design in double volute form. In a furniture context, the design is often associated with a scrolling effect of the arms of a chair or sofa. The lyre arm design arises in many periods of furniture, including Neoclassical schools and in particular the American Federal Period and the Victorian era. Well known designers who employed this stylistic element include the noted New York City furniture designer Duncan Phyfe.

The term lyre chair is a closely associated design element also originating in motif from the Greek Classical period and appearing often in chair backs starting circa 1700 AD. In the lyre chair, the splat features a pair of single lyre scrolls with bilateral symmetry. This particular splat chair back was a favourite motif employed by the well known English furniture designer Thomas Sheraton. Sometimes a chair of this design is called a lyre back chair.

== In musical apparatus ==
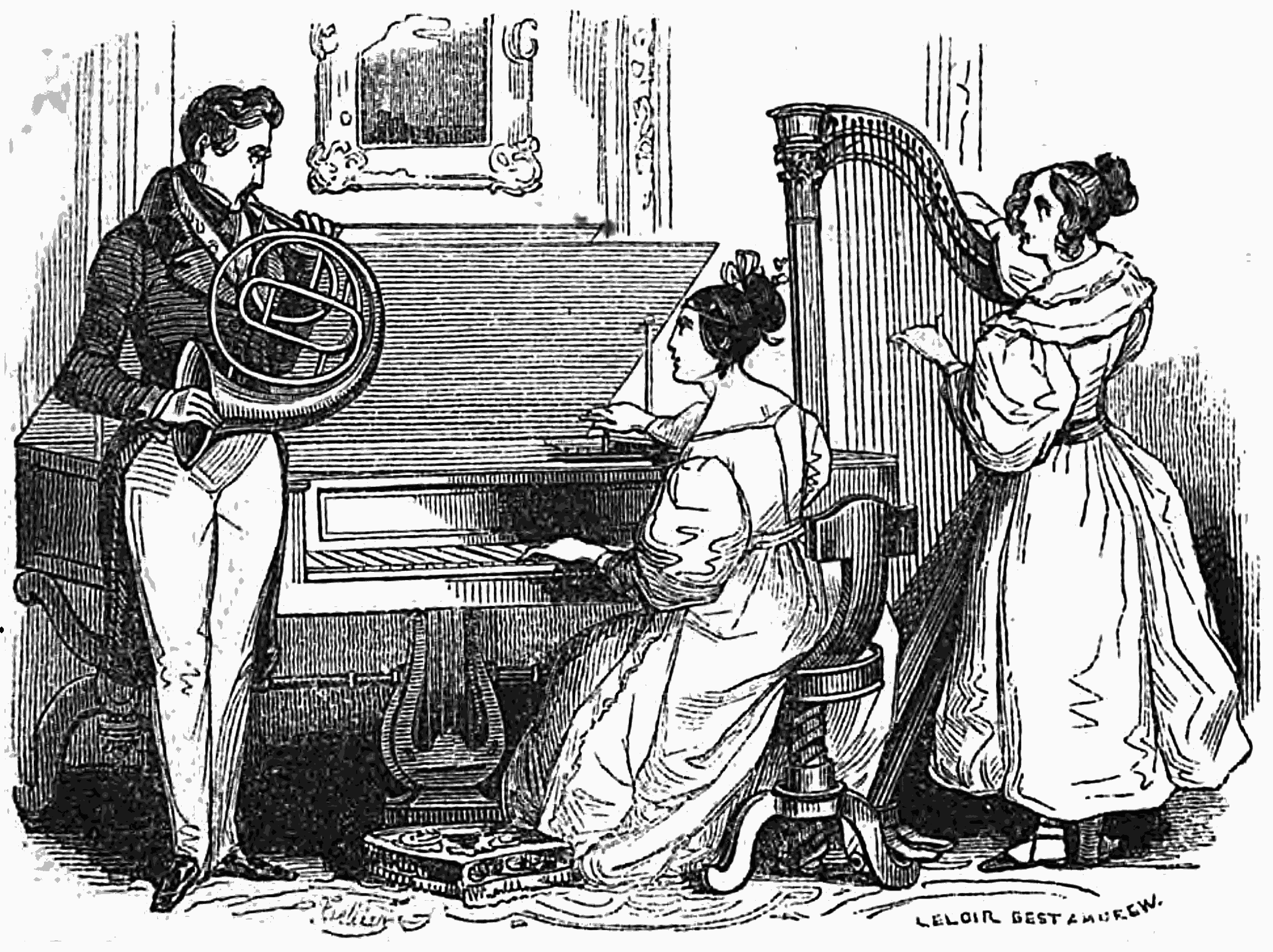
A square piano with a lyre-shaped pedal assembly from the title page of Claude Montal's 1836 book on tuning and repairing pianos

Not surprisingly the lyre motif has been used through history as an element of music stand and other musical appurtenance design. Perhaps most commonly the lyre design has been used for centuries as the backing of sheet music stands. As an example of the lyre design in other musical furniture, one highly ornate piano described in the 1902 catalog of the collection of the New York Metropolitan Museum of Art was depicted as: "having in the centre a lyre supporting the pedals".

== Other use of the lyre design ==
Beyond the use of the lyre design in chairs, this motif is common in other decorative applications for furniture and other contents' accessories. In prehistoric Celtic design, the lyre is present in a number of works including a well preserved scabbard found in Antrim, Northern Ireland and now preserved in the Ulster Museum; this artifact has a bilaterally symmetric double lyre design. For example, in the Empire Period the lyre was commonly applied to mirrors, especially in the American Federal Period. In London in the late 18th century, Thomas Sheraton illustrated the lyre design for use in table supports. Another example of lyre supports in a table design is illustrated in History Of Furniture: Ancient to 19th Century, showing a small ebony table. Lockwood also documents that Sheraton enjoyed using a painted form of the lyre on furniture elements as decoration. Lockwood further illustrates a lyre supported games table from circa 1820 believed to have been produced by Duncan Phyfe.

== In fiction ==
Numerous references exist to the lyre arm or lyre chair in fictional literature, the lyre design being associated with historical splendour and opulent living circumstances. In the noted artist Honoré Daumier's work Emportez donc ca plus loin an emancipated woman appears (illustrated within the work) in a lyre shaped chair by a cabriole leg desk at work while her husband minds the couple's child. In a further example in the Irish Manor House Murder reference is made to an expensive "Renaissance lyre chair" in the context of a very fine piece of furniture. In another instance the lyre chair design was used to evoke period opulence in a parlour scene of The Call of Cthulhu and Other Weird Stories; in that scene one of the characters sank into a lyre chair in the presence of other fine period furnishings including a Chippendale table.

In modern literature the lyre chair is sometimes referenced outside its context of classical furniture merely as the backdrop to a scene description as in the novel Le Tournesol, where a sensuous sequence unfolds: "She tossed her underclothing onto the lyre chair, pulled down the bedspread, slipped into bed, stretched out for the light switch and curled into the tepid darkness of her covers."

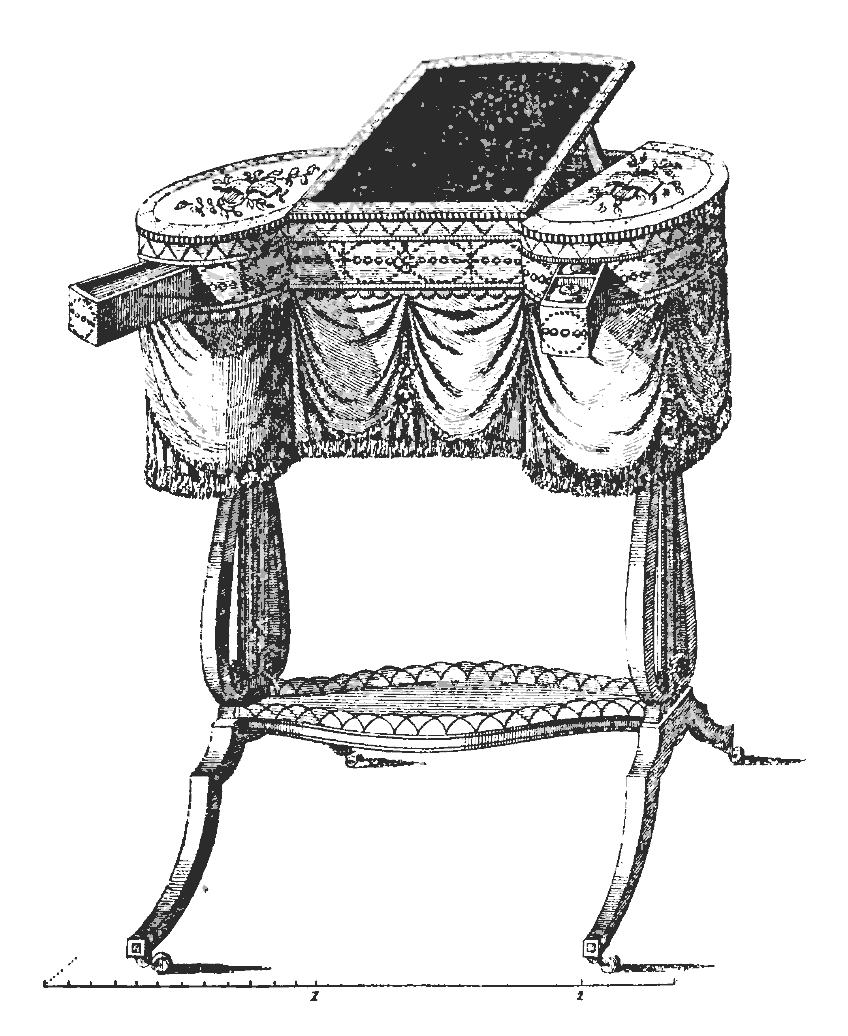
Ladies work-table with two lyre-stands, from Sheraton's 1793 supplement to The Cabinet-Maker and Upholsterer's Drawing Book

Lyre-shaped pillars for tables from the 1811 London Cabinetmakers Union Book of Prices

Lyre-shaped "bannister" for a music chair from the 1827 supplement to the London Chair-Makers' and Carvers' Book of Prices

Grecian sofa with plain, swept and scroll ended swept arms from the 1827 supplement to the London Chair-Makers' and Carvers' Book of Prices

== See also ==
- Armrest
