= Luke Vincent Lockwood =

American furniture designer (1872–1951)

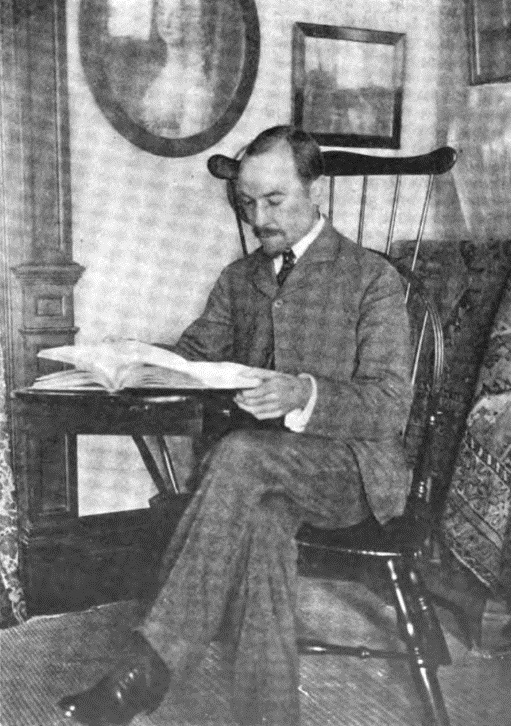
Luke Vincent Lockwood

Luke Vincent Lockwood (February 1, 1872, Brooklyn – 1951) was a lawyer and an author in the field of furniture design of the Federal Period in United States.

A son of Luke A. Lockwood and his wife, Mary Louise Lyon, daughter of Captain William Lyon and Catherine Mead, Lockwood was the fifth great-grandson of the English immigrant and Greenwich colonist, Robert Lockwood and his wife, Susan Norman, daughter of Captain Richard Norman.

He has been termed the "pioneering furniture scholar" in America. He served as the president of the Municipal Art Commission in New York from 1944 to 1946. Lockwood served as the vice-president of the Museum of the City of New York, the director of the Fine Arts Federation and the president of the Woman's Hospital, the Greenwich Hospital and the Greenwich News and Graphic. He also sat on the governing committee of the Brooklyn Museum, the Board of Estimate & Taxation of Greenwich and the board of the Greenwich Trust Company. He married on November 16, 1897, Alice Gardner Burnell. He died January 23, 1951, at Greenwich, Connecticut. He was also a very active member of Acacia Lodge No. 85 of Ancient, Free and Accepted Masons in Greenwich, Connecticut.

== Selected works ==
- Colonial Furniture in America, Luke Vincent Lockwood, Scribner Publishers (1901)

== See also ==
- Duncan Phyfe
- Hepplewhite
- Lyre arm
- Thomas Sheraton
