= Canapé à confidante =

Type of sofa

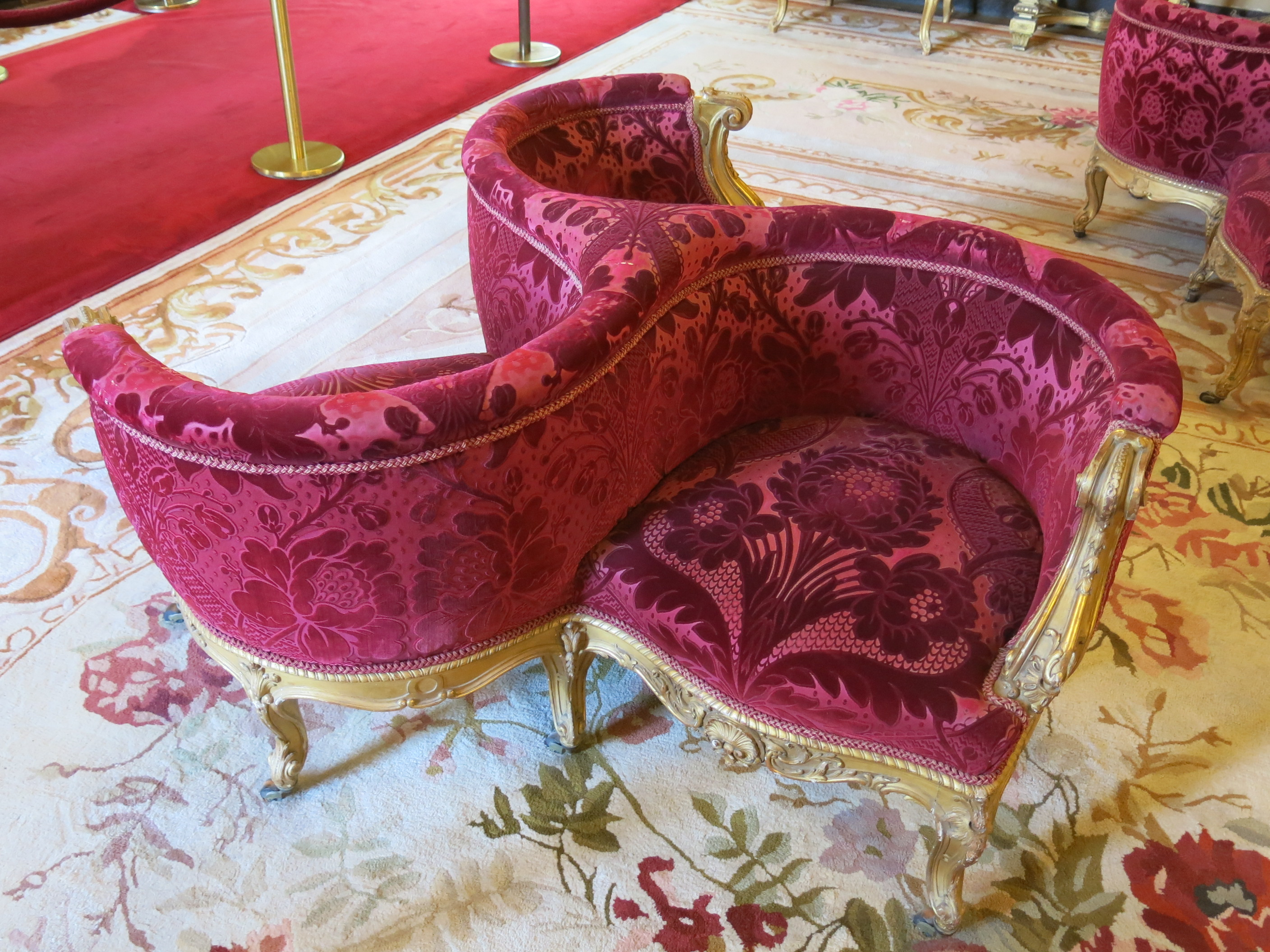
an example of an indescret in the Grand Salon of the Napoleon 3rd apartments in the Louvre museum.

An indiscret (also known as a canapé à joue, a canapé à confidants, or a canapé à confidante) is a type of sofa, originally characterized by a triangular seat at each end, so that people could sit at either end of the sofa and be close to the person(s) sitting in the middle. The ends were sometimes detachable, and could be removed and used on their own as Burjair chairs. The name Confidante was coined by cabinetmaker George Hepplewhite, who described it in his Cabinet-Maker and Upholsterer's Guide as being "of French origin, and is in pretty general request for large and spacious suits of apartments. An elegant drawing-room, with modern furniture, is scarce complete without a Confidante...".

== See also ==
- Loveseat, a piece of furniture combining two seats in the shape of the letter S
