= Sheraton style =

Late 18th-century neoclassical English furniture style

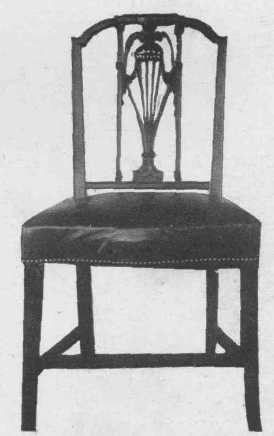
A Sheraton style chair with rectangular back

Sheraton is a late 18th-century Neoclassical English furniture style, in vogue c. 1785–1820, that was coined by 19th-century collectors and dealers to credit furniture designer Thomas Sheraton, whose books, The Cabinet Dictionary (1803) of engraved designs and the Cabinet Maker's & Upholsterer's Drawing Book (1791) of furniture patterns exemplify this style.

The Sheraton style was inspired by the Louis XVI style and features round, tapered legs, fluting and, most notably, contrasting veneer inlays. Sheraton style furniture takes lightweight rectilinear forms, using satinwood, mahogany, tulipwood, sycamore and rosewood for inlaid decorations, although painted finishes are also to be found. Swags, husks, flutings, festoons, and rams' heads are amongst the common motifs applied to pieces of this style.

The style brought the Neoclassical taste of architects like Robert Adam within reach of the middle class. In many respects, Sheraton style corresponds with the contemporary Directoire style of France. The Sheraton style was the most reproduced style in the United States during the Federal period.
