= Armrest =

Part of a chair

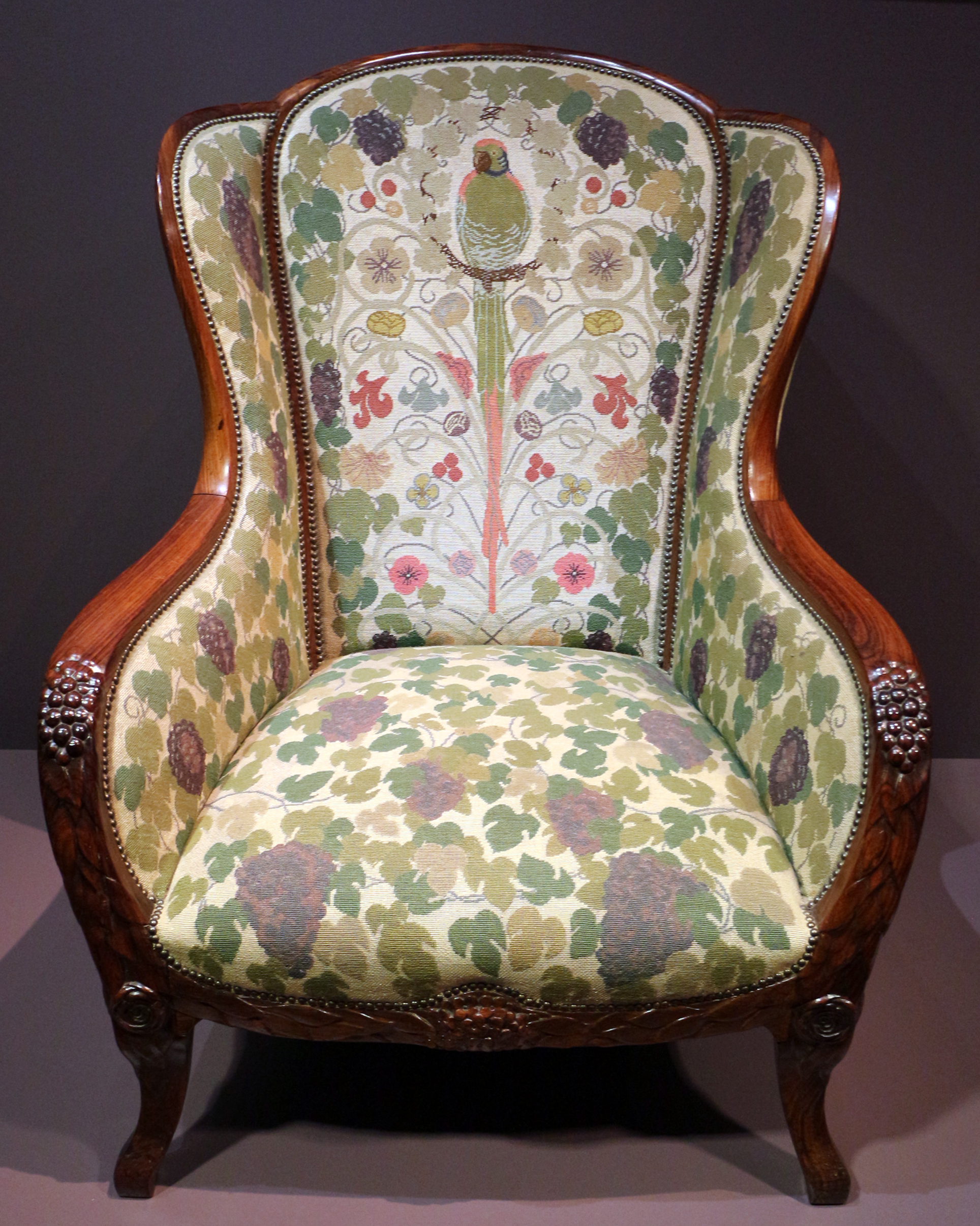
Armchair by Adrien Karbowsky, 1912–1913, Musée d'Orsay (Paris)

An armrest (or arm-rest) is a part of a chair, where a person can rest their arms on. Armrests are built into a large variety of chairs such as automotive chairs, armchairs, airline seats, sofas, and more. Adjustable armrests are commonly found in ergonomic office chairs and gaming chairs.

== In automobiles ==
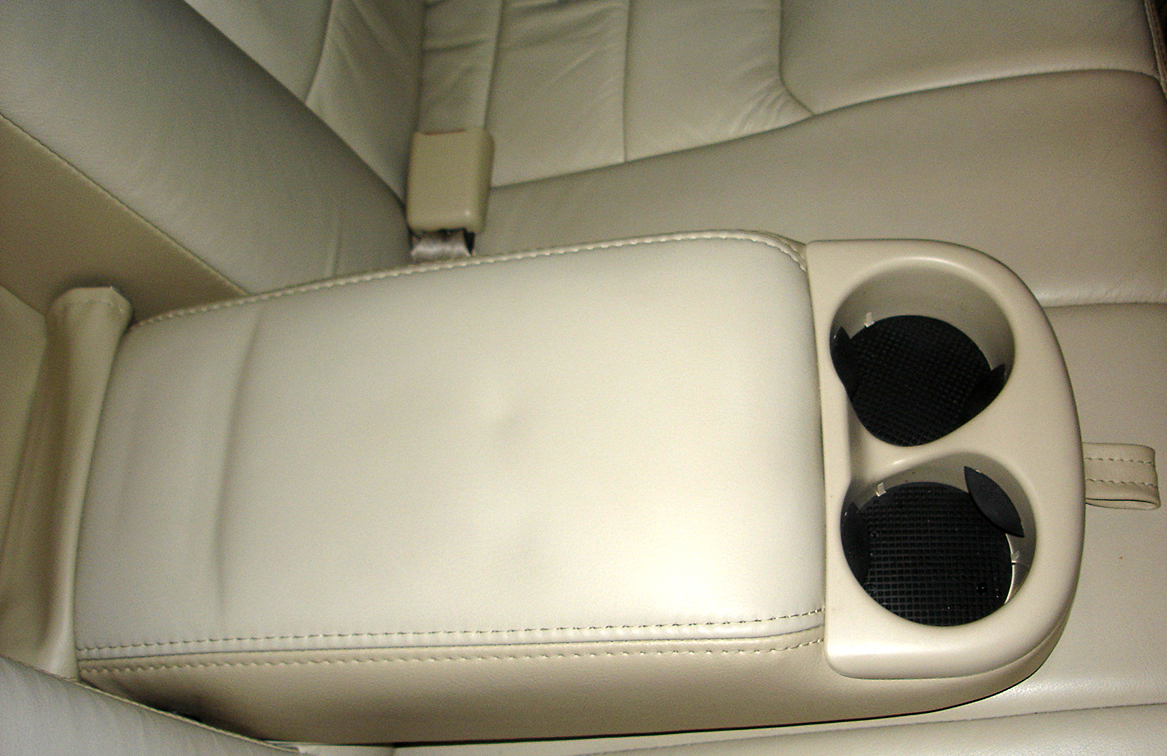
The armrest in the backseat of a Lincoln Town Car, featuring cupholders.

Armrests are also a feature found in most modern automobiles, on which the occupants can rest their arms. Armrests are commonly placed between the front car seats on the driver and passenger side of the vehicle. Sometimes one or two armrests may also be attached to each individual seat, a feature commonly found in minivans (MPVs) and some SUVs.

Many larger cars also have a broad arm-rest between the back seats, which may be folded out when the central (third) seating place is not required. In some designs where occupant safety is emphasised, including some Volvo models, the armrest doubles as a child seat, complete with specially adjustable seatbelt.

Armrests in some vehicles may also feature further accessories, such as cup holders, audio and climate controls as well as storage compartments.

== See also ==
- Footstool
- Head restraint
- Human factors and ergonomics
- Lyre arm
