= Loveseat =

Type of 2-seat chair

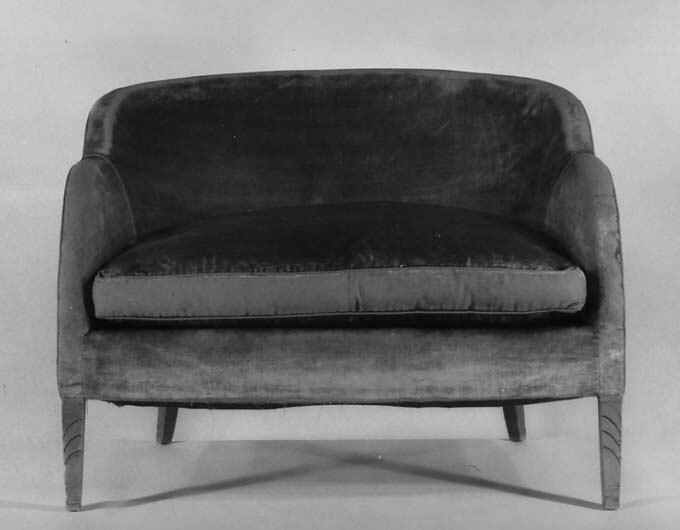
Loveseat or two-seater settee, 1930, Metropolitan Museum of Art.

A loveseat can be one of two styles of two-seat chair.

One form – also known as "British two-seaters" – is essentially synonymous with "two-seat couch". It typically has two upholstered seats, is approximately 50" in seating length, and is typically shorter in length than a settee.

Another form, variously also known as a tête-à-tête, courting bench, kissing bench, gossip's chair, or conversation bench, is any form of two-seat furniture where the two seats are arranged in an S shape, so that two persons can converse while looking at each other and being within arm's reach, while at the same time typically retaining a modest barrier between them.

== History ==
While chairs wide enough to seat multiple people are not a novel concept, wide upholstered chairs intended for one person became popular towards the end of the 18th century to accommodate the wider dresses in fashion then, and these began to be marketed and sold as "loveseats" in the early 19th century.

The tête-à-tête style loveseat became popular in the Victorian era, and the design may have initially arisen in France.

=== Straight-fronted two-seaters or loveseats ===
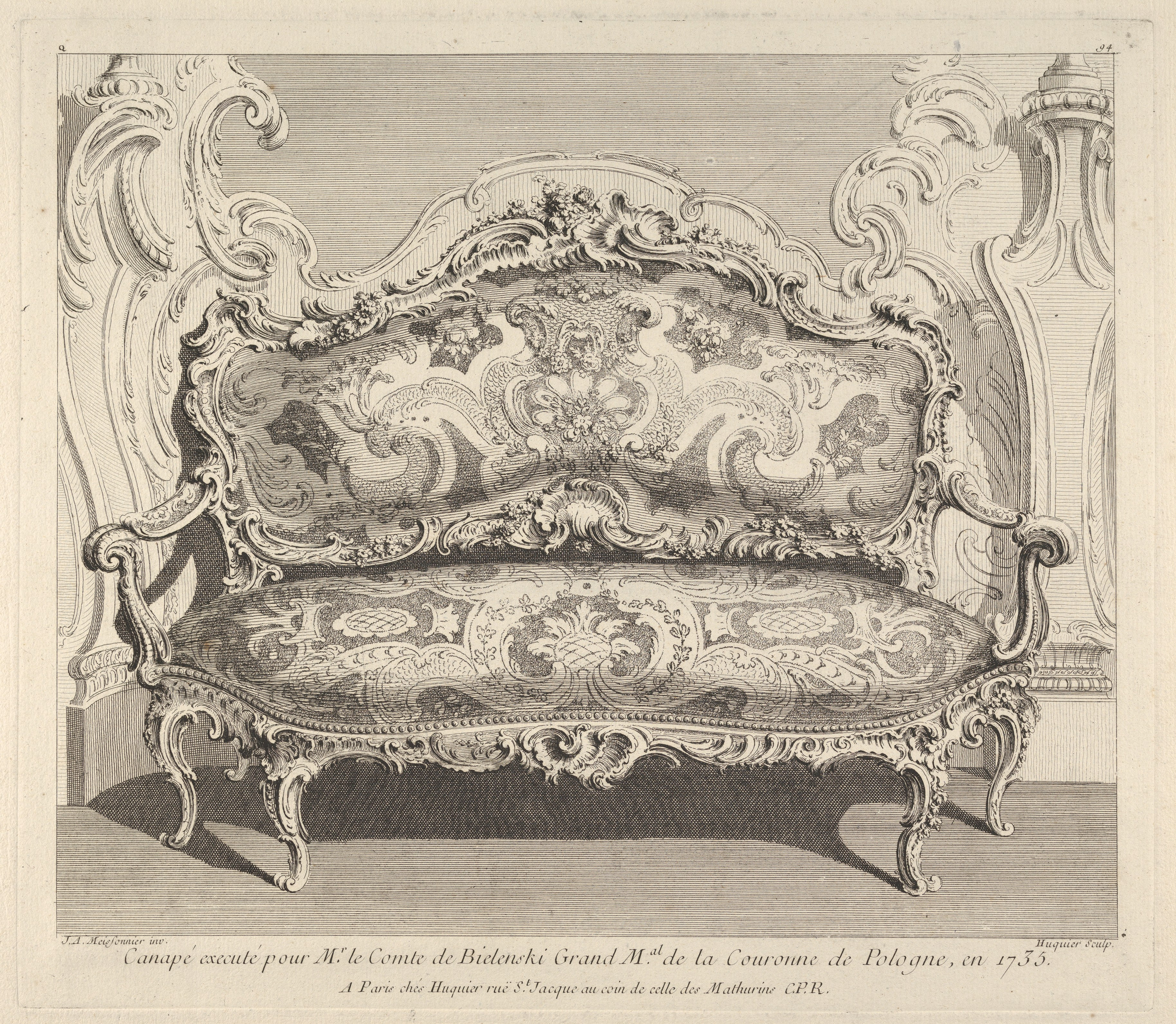
French two-seater settee, Paris, 1735, print, Metropolitan Museum of Art.

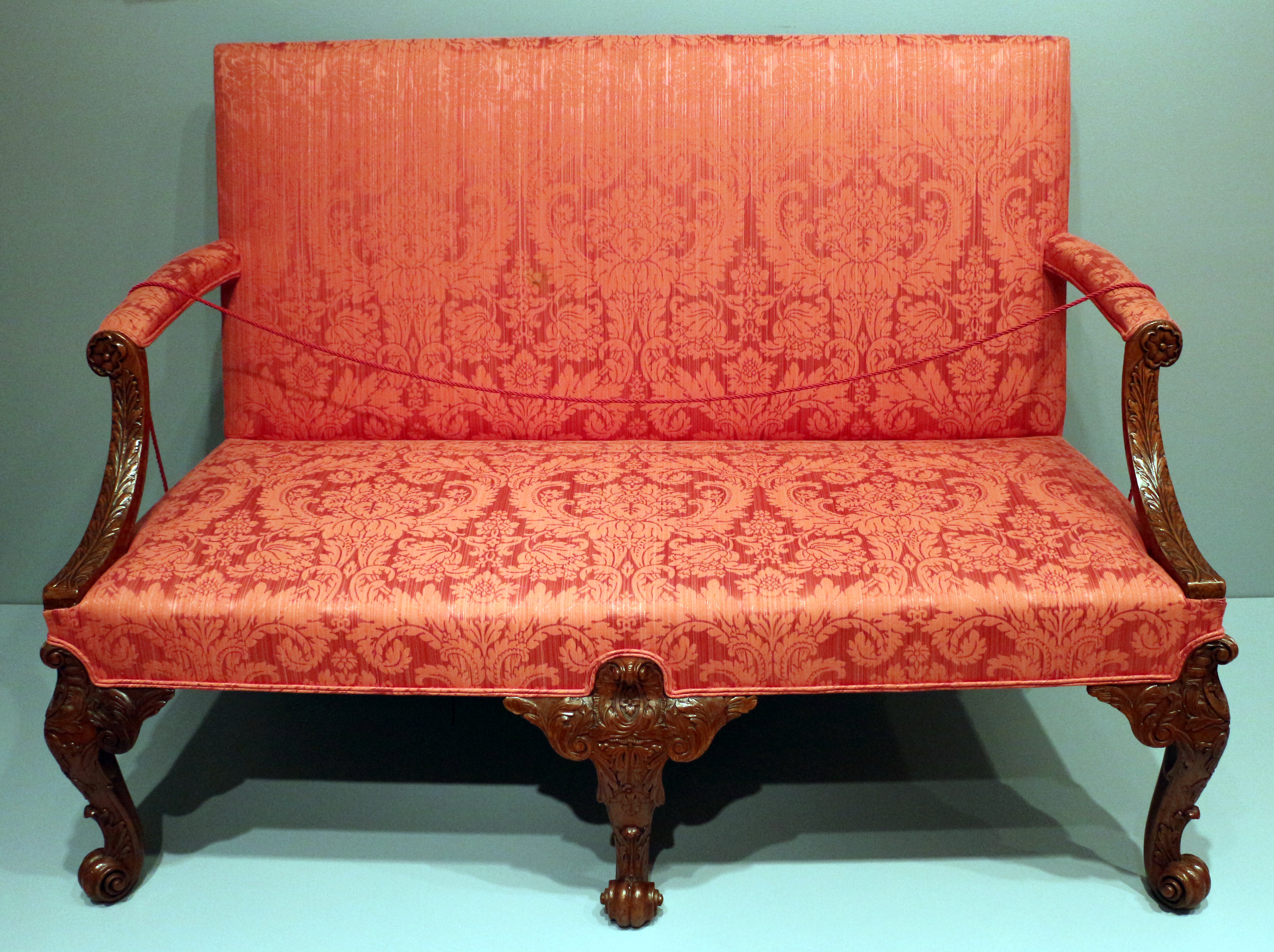
British two-seater, London, 1740/1750, Cincinnati Art Museum.

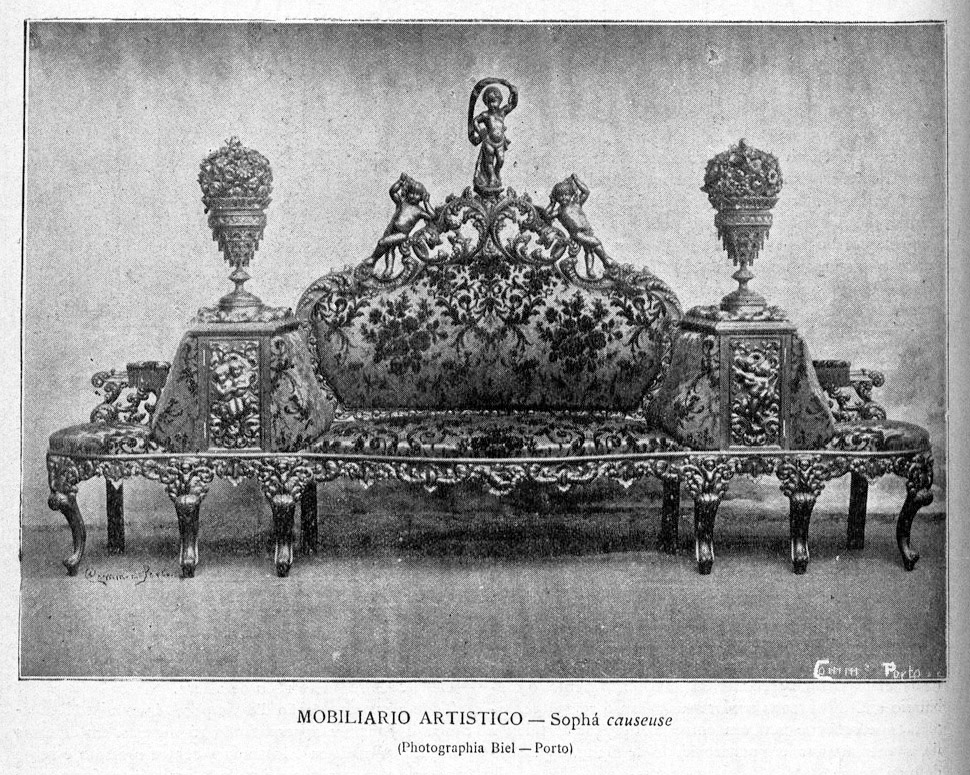
Confidante, two-seater with triangular seats at either end, before 1897, rococo revival style, Portugal.

=== S-shaped two-seaters or tête-à-tête seats ===
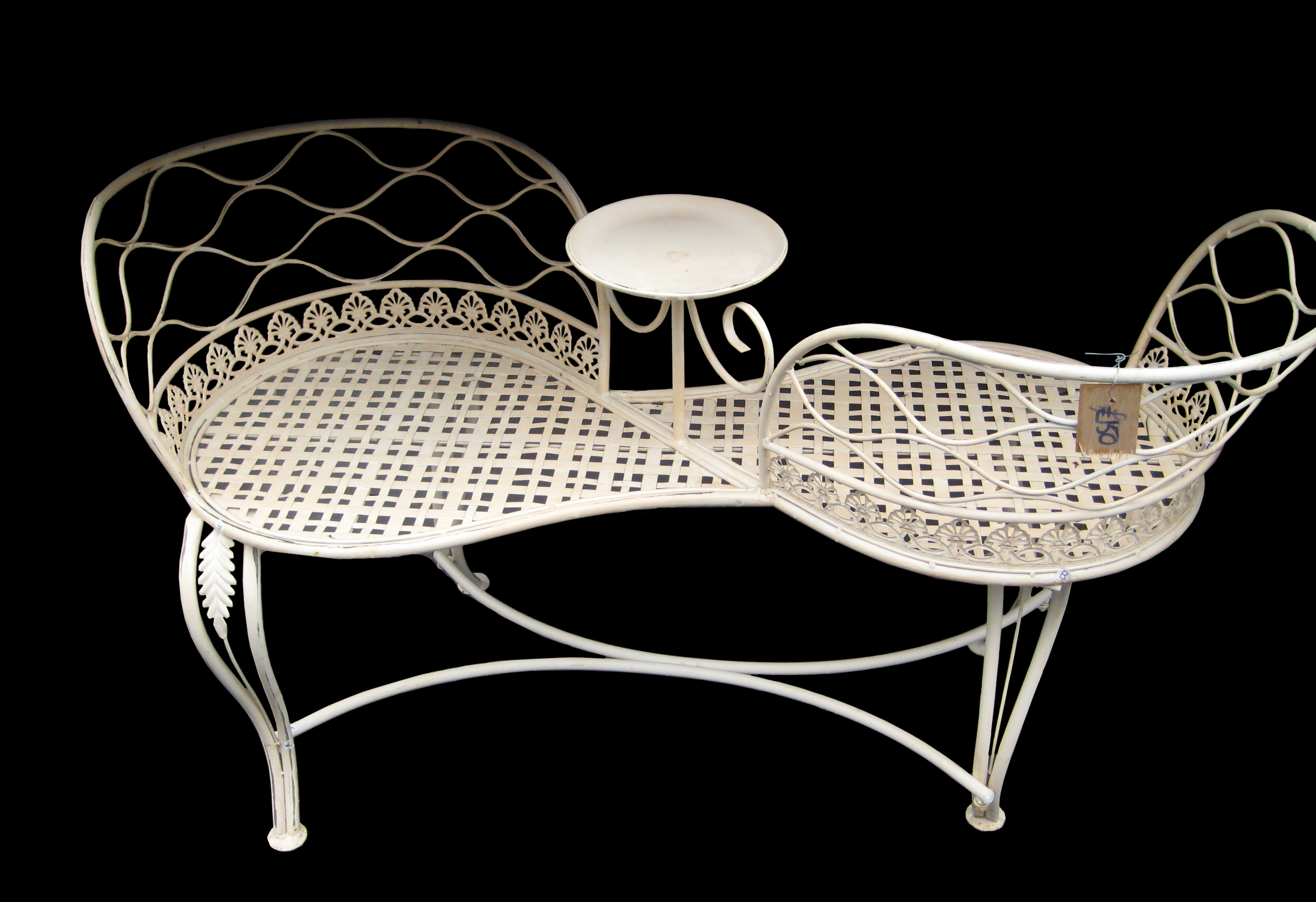
Tête-à-tête garden seats.

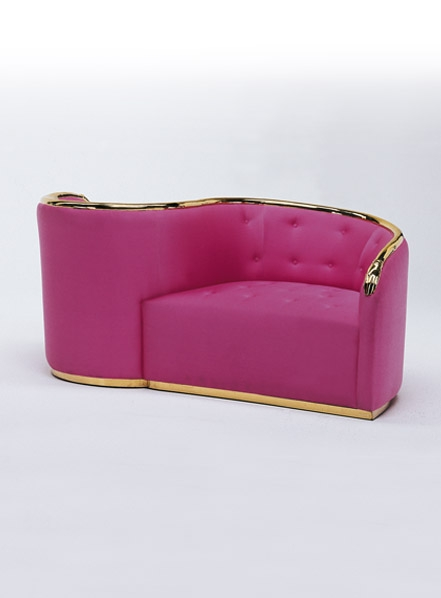
A contemporary tête-à-tête sofa.

== See also ==
- Canapé à confidante, a sofa with a seat at each end
