= Oval Office grandfather clock =

Longcase clock in the Oval Office of the White House

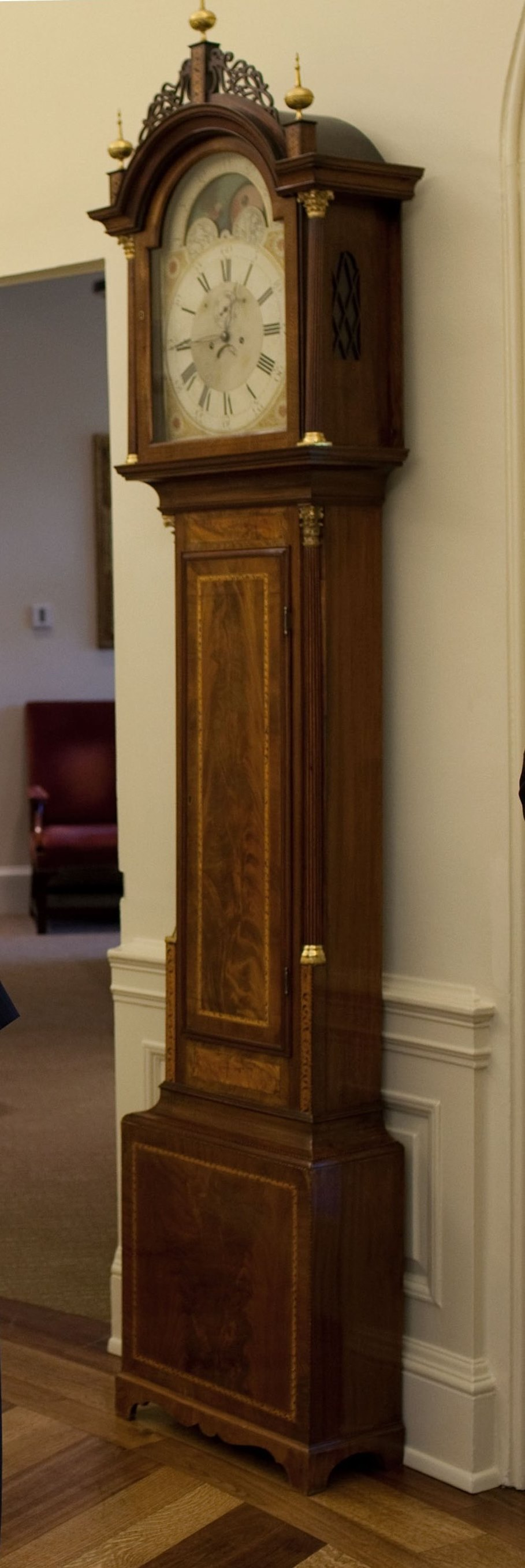
Seymour clock in the Oval Office

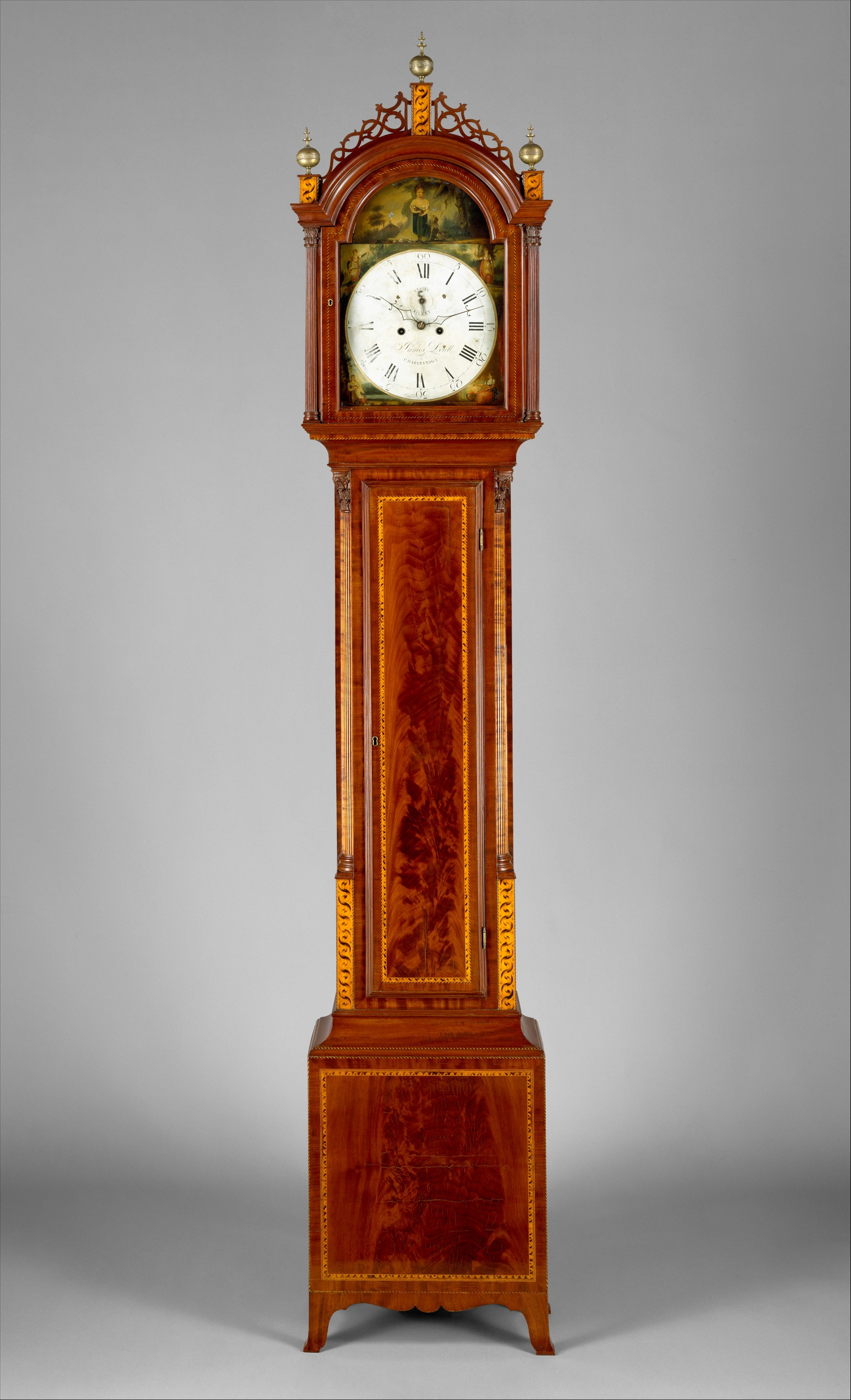
Similar Seymour clock in the Metropolitan Museum of Art

The Seymour tall case clock in the White House, more commonly known as the Oval Office grandfather clock, is an 8-foot-10-inch (269 cm) grandfather clock, made between 1795 and 1805 in Boston by John and Thomas Seymour, and has been located in the Oval Office since 1975. Since the presidency of Gerald Ford it has remained one of the few constant features in the office, throughout several renovations.

== Features ==
Made of mahogany, it features "crotch birch and satinwood veneers", a "double lunette inlay", and a movement likely made by James Doull of Charlestown, Massachusetts. According to a memo prepared for First Lady Betty Ford in 1975, the previous First Lady Patricia Nixon "... was partially gifted (and partially purchased) the 'wonderful collection of very beautiful and rather feminine American furniture' by the Seymours from Boston's Vernon Stoneman in 1972." Since installation in the Oval Office, it has been at the room's northeast corner (between the visiting guests' door from the Personal Secretary's office and the portal to the West Colonnade). Immigrants from England, the Seymours (father and son) are considered master cabinetmakers in the federal style. They perfected their craft in New England during "one of the most pivotal chapters in American history" to create "truly iconic pieces of American furniture". Its commercial value has been estimated at $100,000. An almost identical Seymour clock of the same period and materials is in the collection of the Metropolitan Museum of Art.

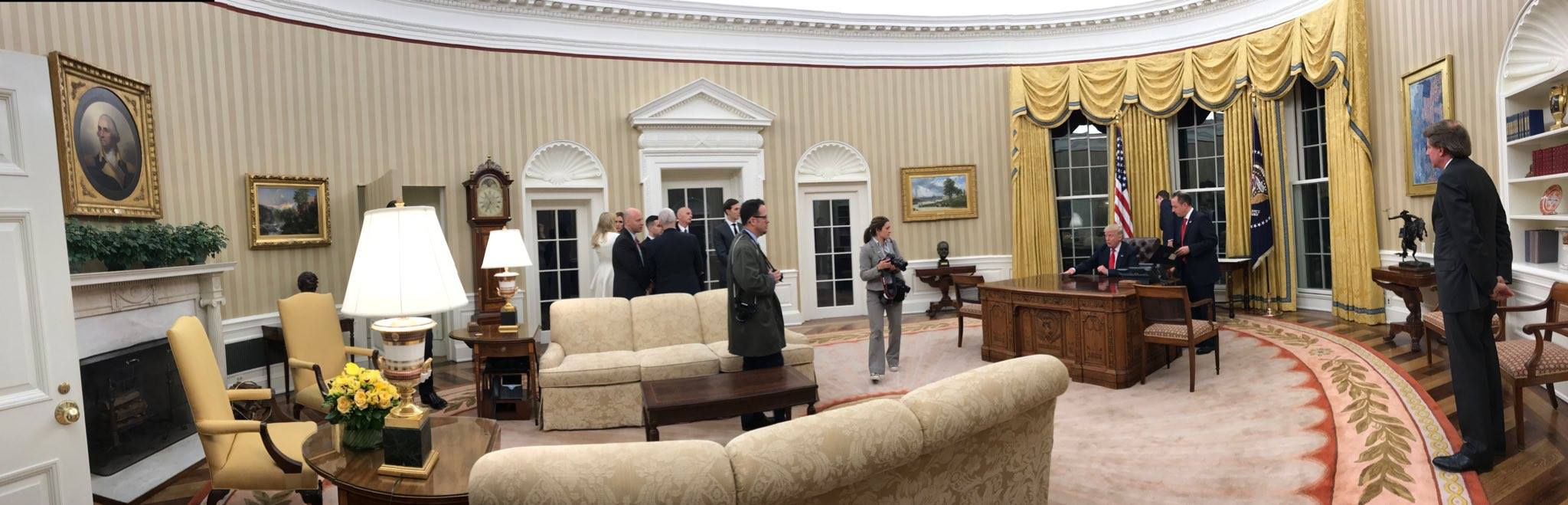
Panorama of the Oval Office (2017) showing the location of the clock next to the northeast "hidden" door leading to the office of the president's secretary.

== Historical appearances ==
Prior to the Seymour clock, another had preceded it in the Oval Office's northeast corner during the Lyndon B. Johnson and early Richard Nixon administrations, from 1965 to 1969. All 85 clocks in the White House (including the 12 longcase clocks), were maintained and wound by John Muffler, the White House's chief electrician and longest-serving employee. The chimes on all White House clocks have all been disabled since an order by Harry S. Truman, due to the difficulty of keeping them all synchronized.

Jimmy Carter said that, during the last stages of the Iran hostage crisis negotiations when he spent forty-eight hours continuously in the Oval Office, "No matter who was with me, we watched the big grandfather clock by the door."

Due to its location, the clock has appeared in the background of many official photographs of successive American presidents receiving world leaders in the Oval Office, and during meetings:

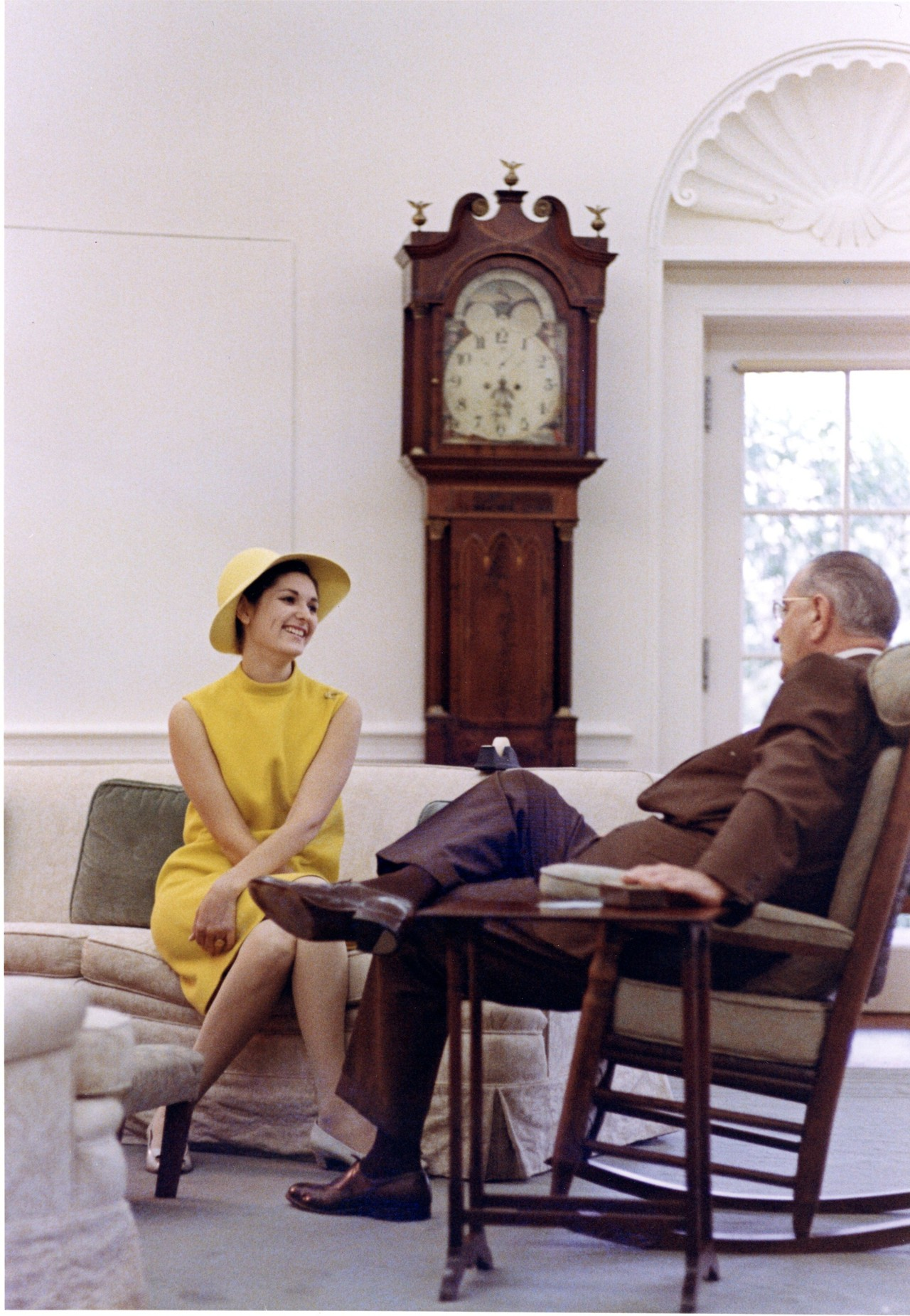
Prior clock near Lyndon Johnson and daughter Lynda Bird (1967)

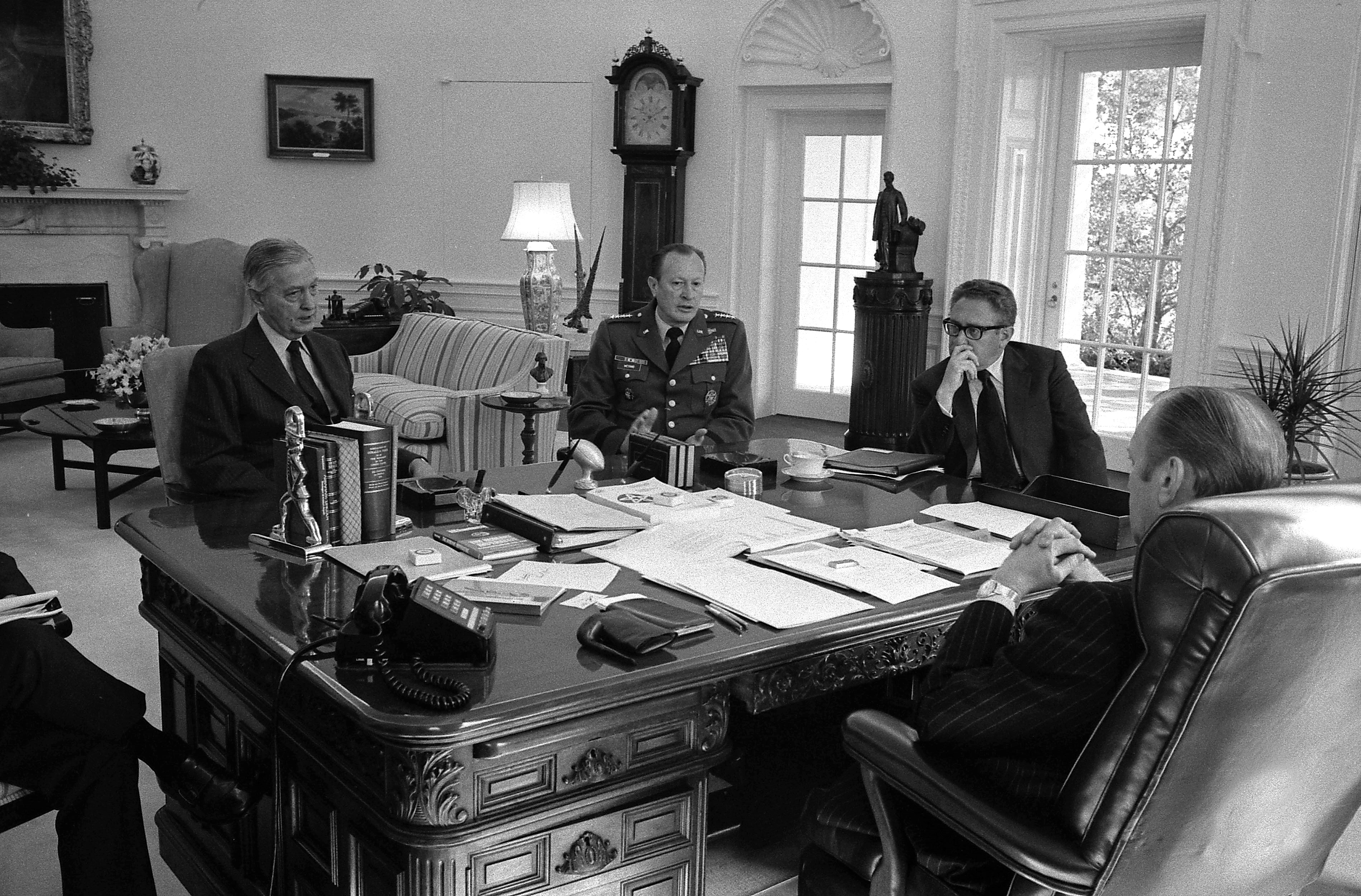
Gerald Ford and Henry Kissinger (1975)

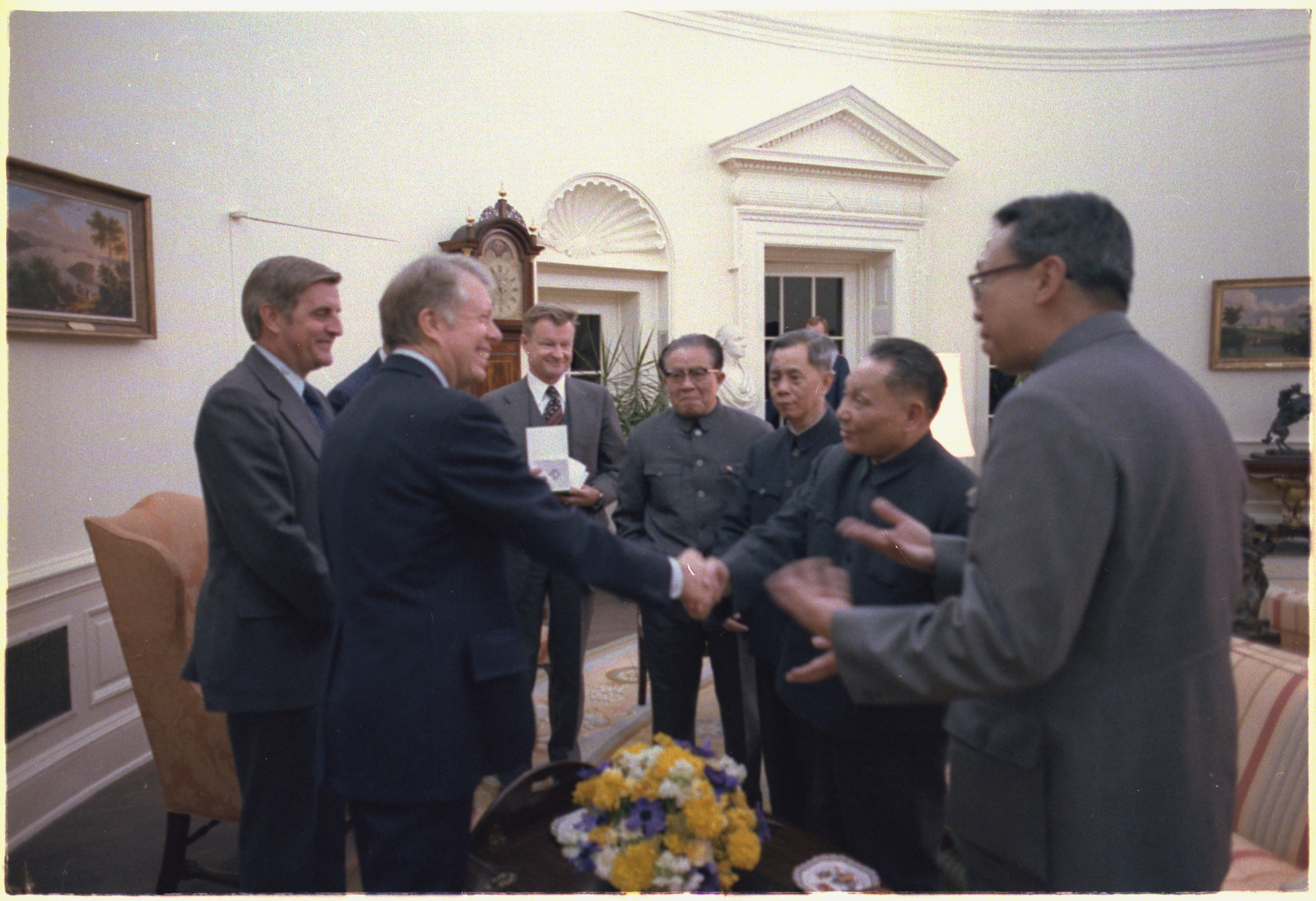
Jimmy Carter and Deng Xiaoping (1979)

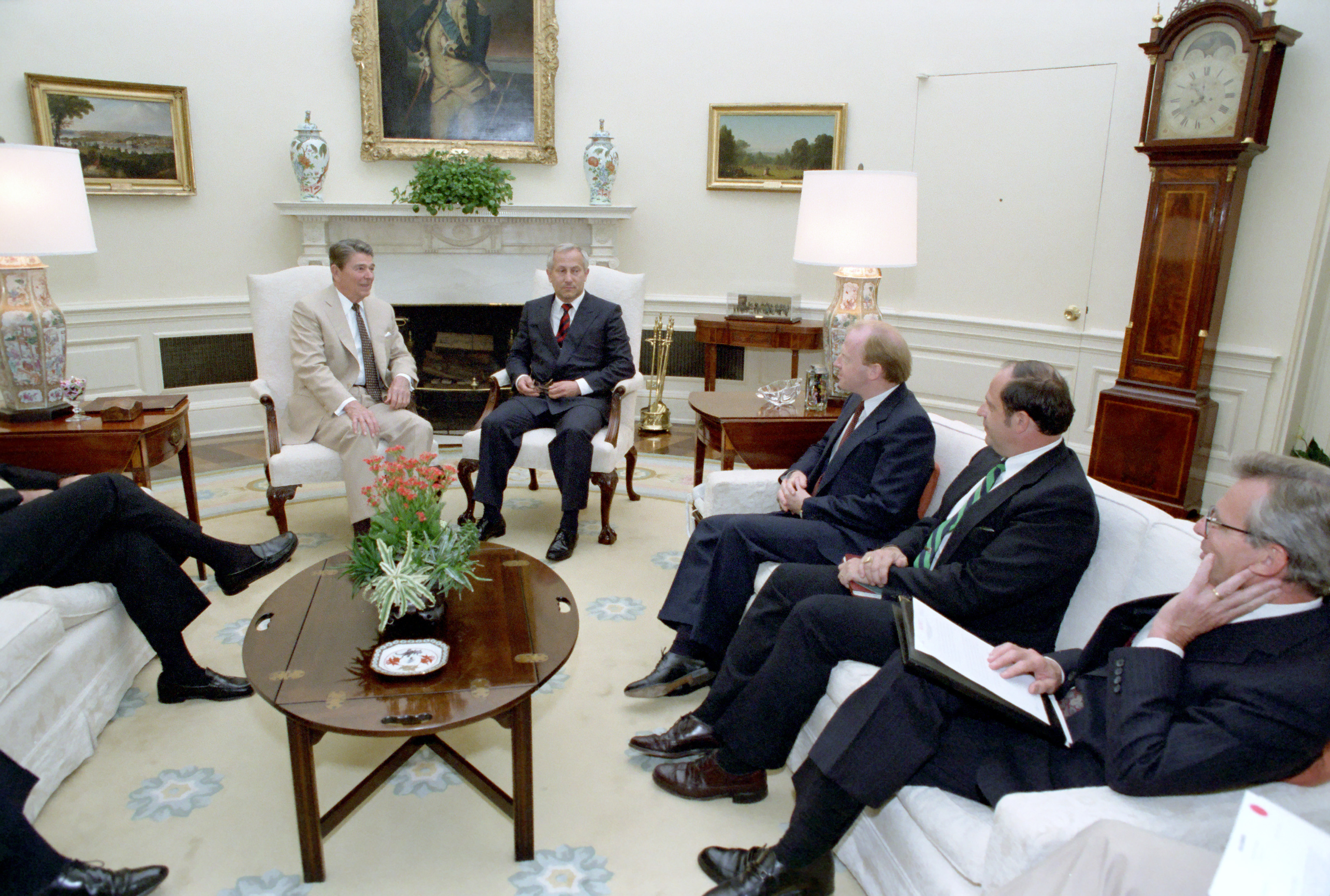
Ronald Reagan and Oleg Gordievsky (1987)

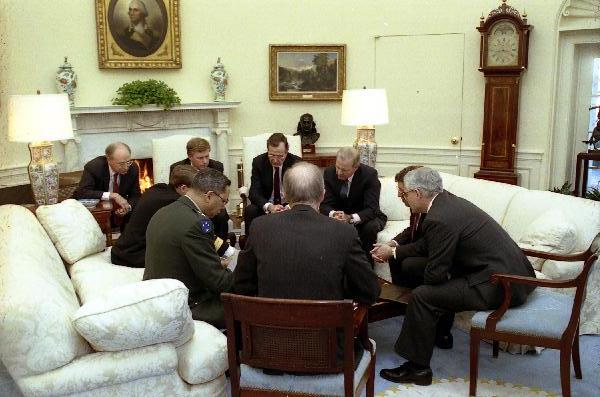
George H. W. Bush discusses Operation Desert Storm with officials (1991)

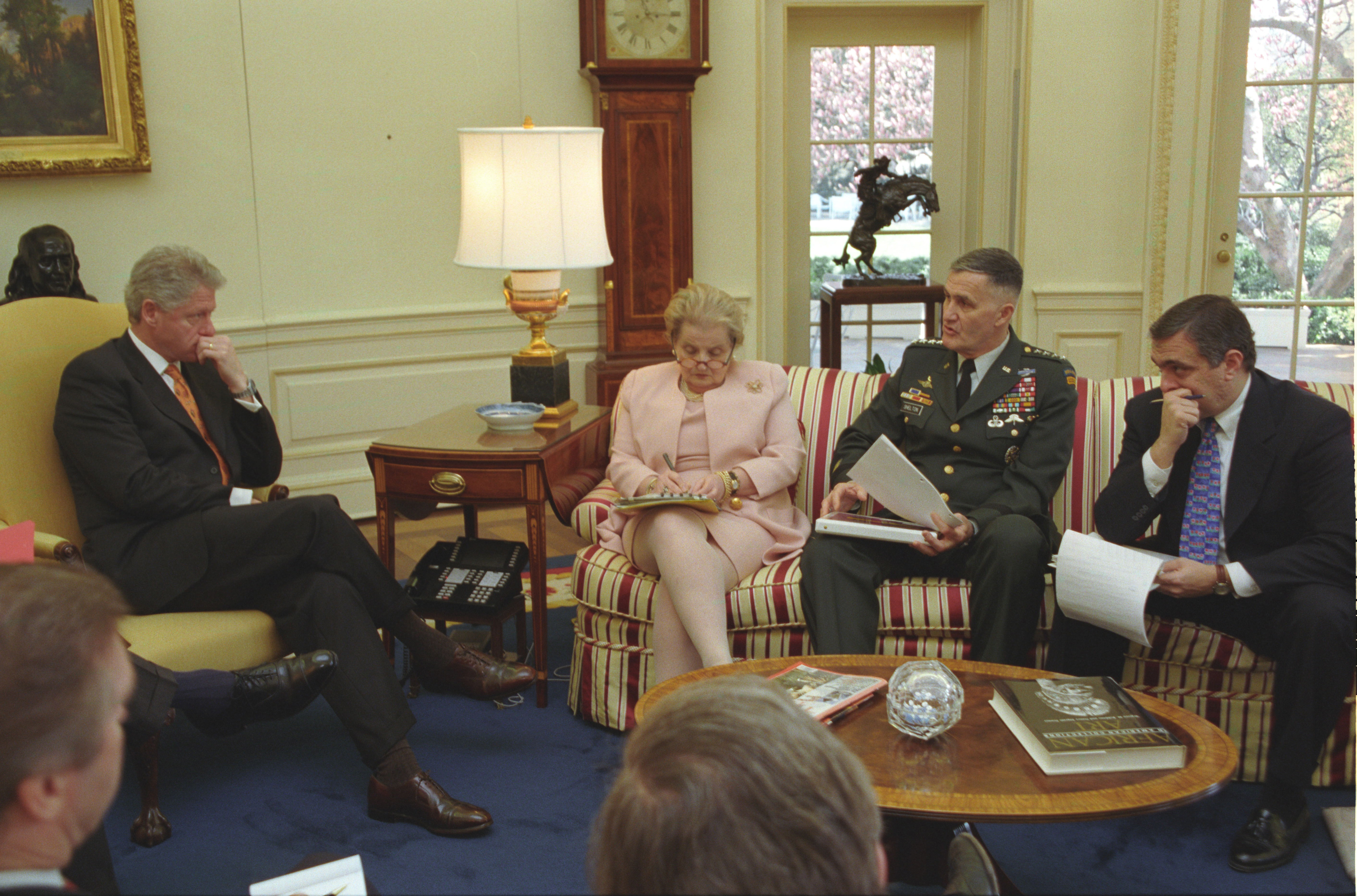
Bill Clinton and Madeleine Albright (1999)

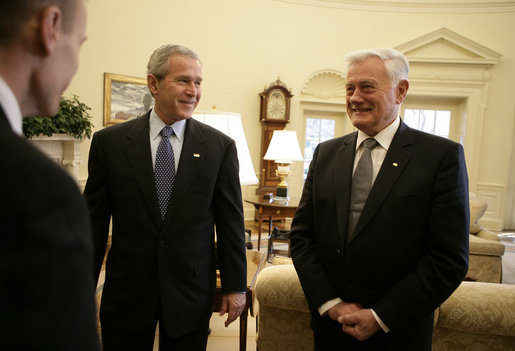
George W. Bush and Valdas Adamkus (2007)

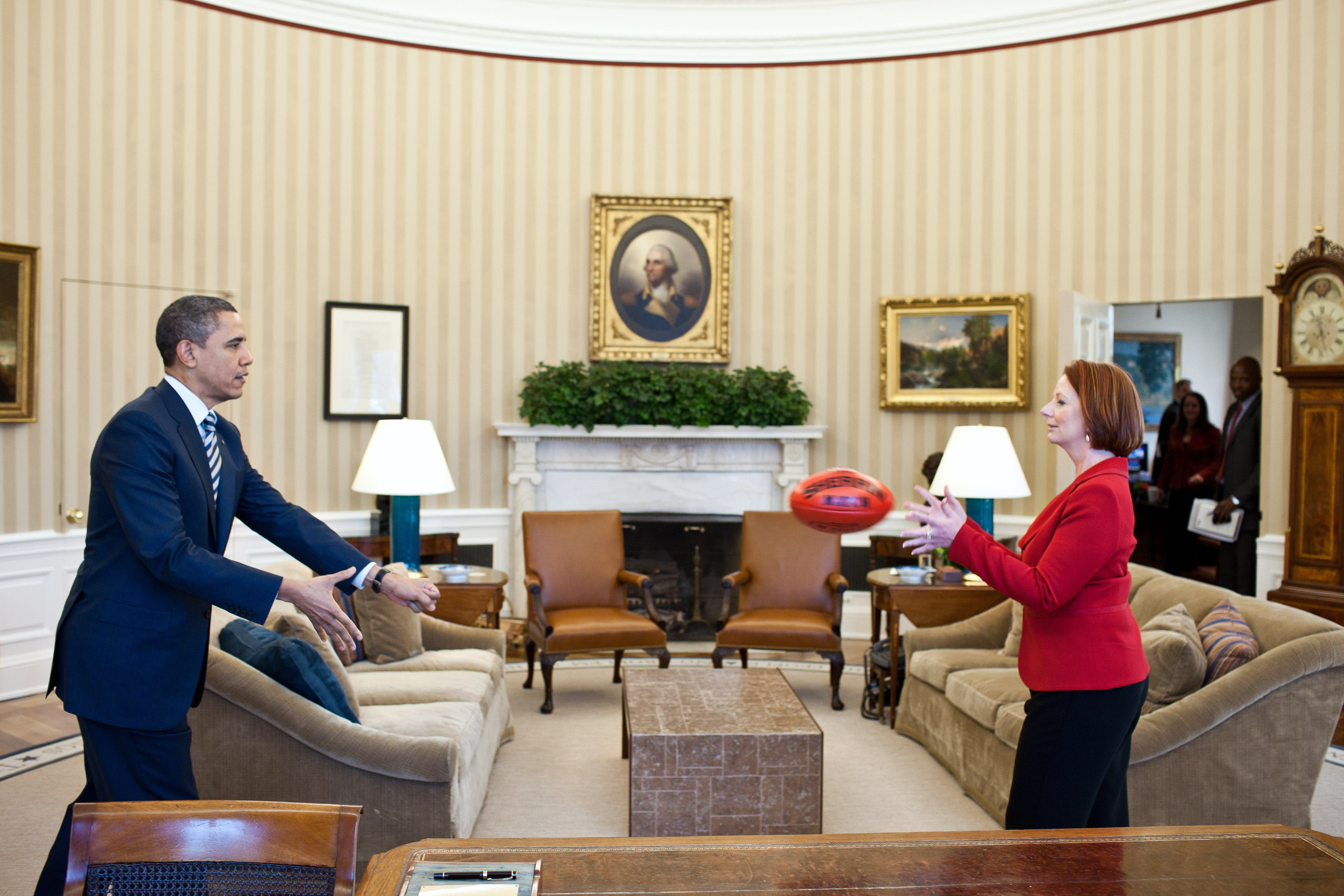
Barack Obama and Julia Gillard (2011)

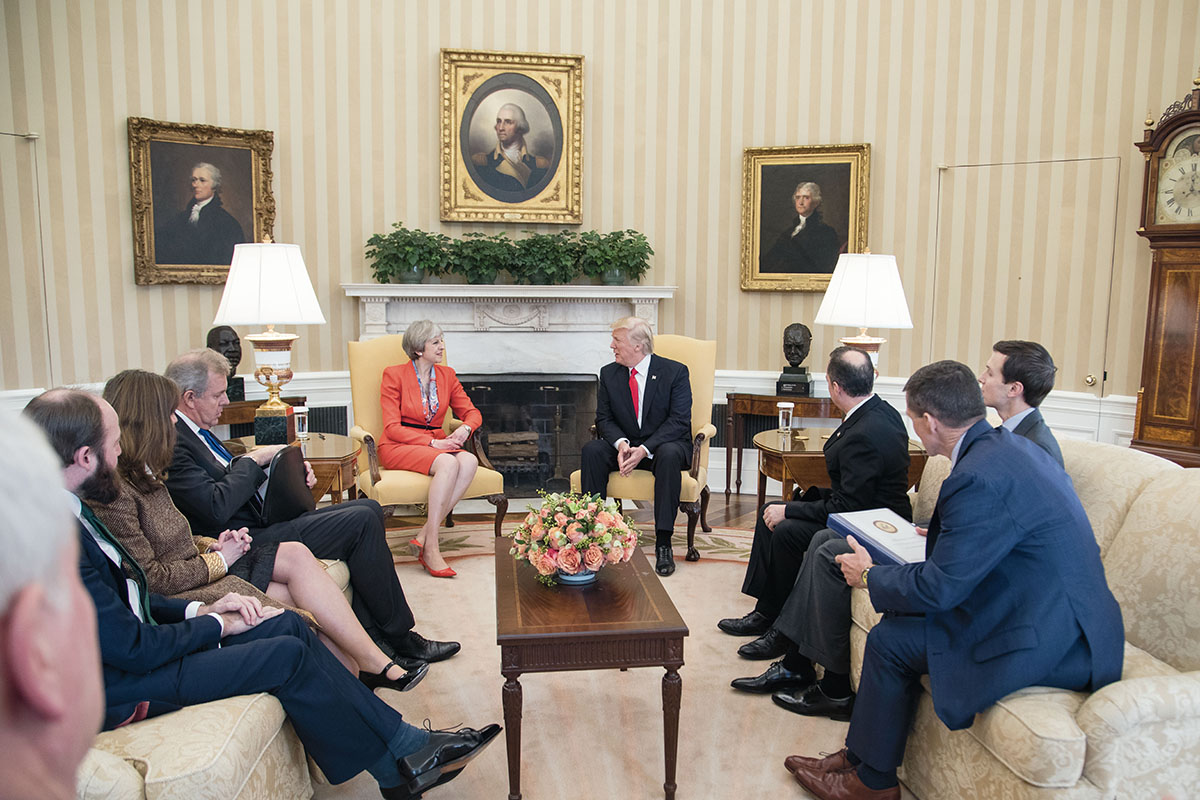
Donald Trump and Theresa May (2017)

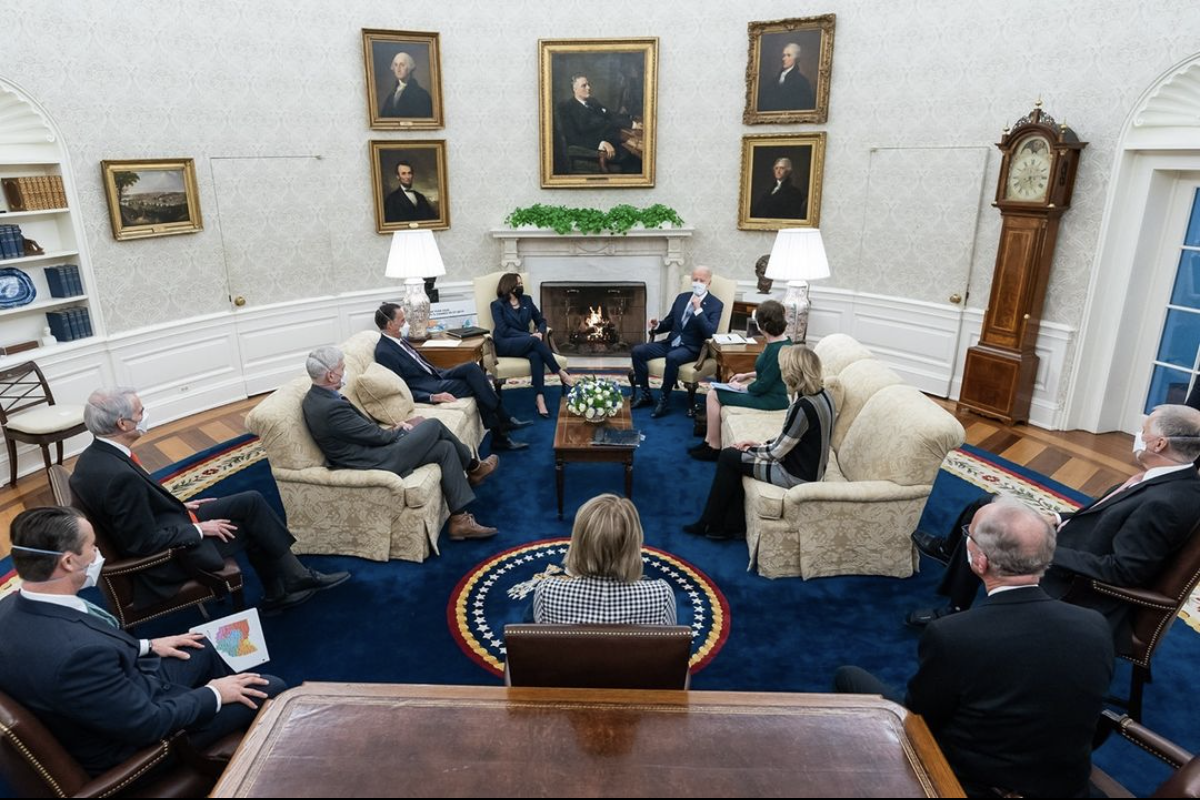
Joe Biden and Kamala Harris meet with Republican senators (2021)

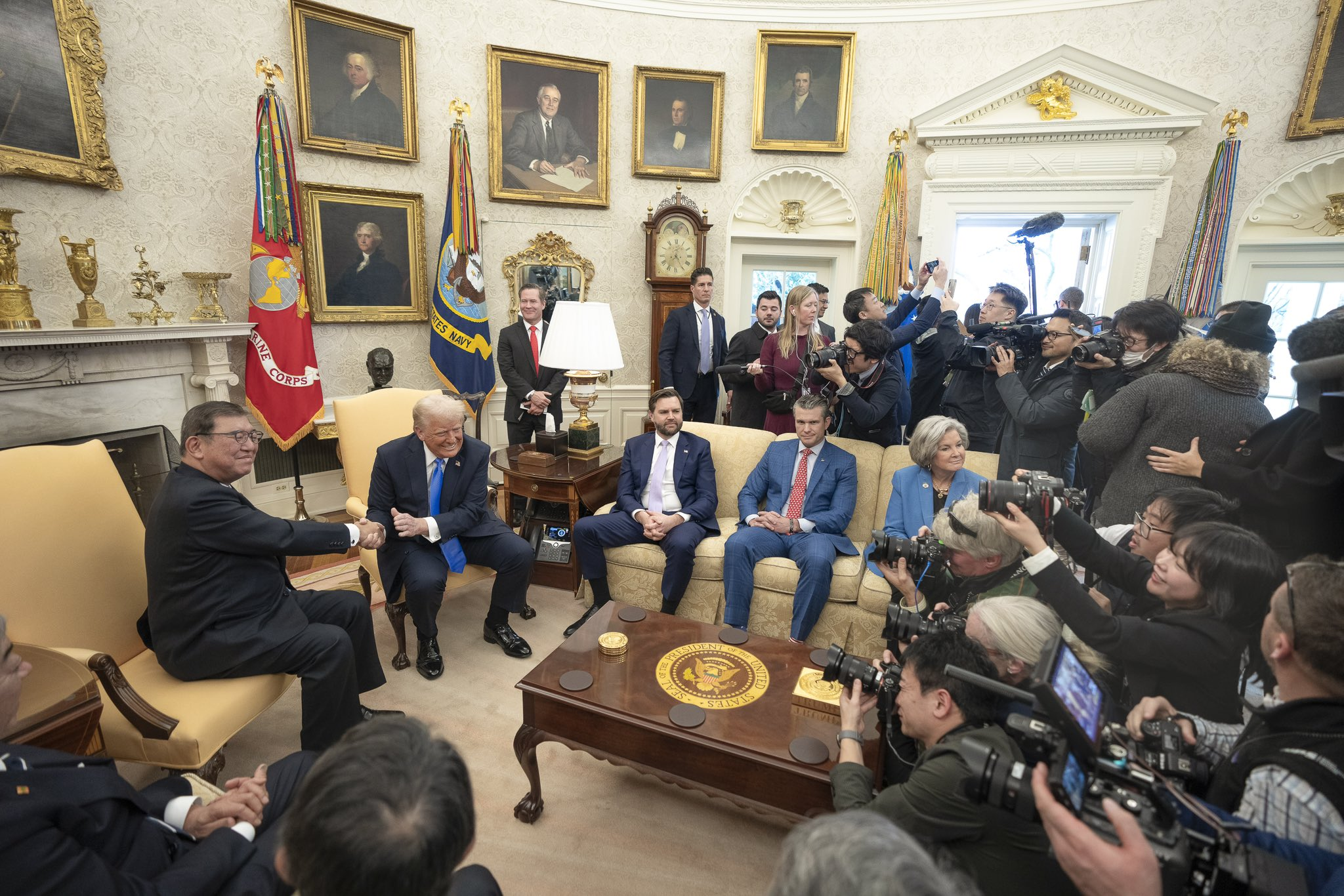
Donald Trump and Shigeru Ishiba (2025)

== Comey testimony ==
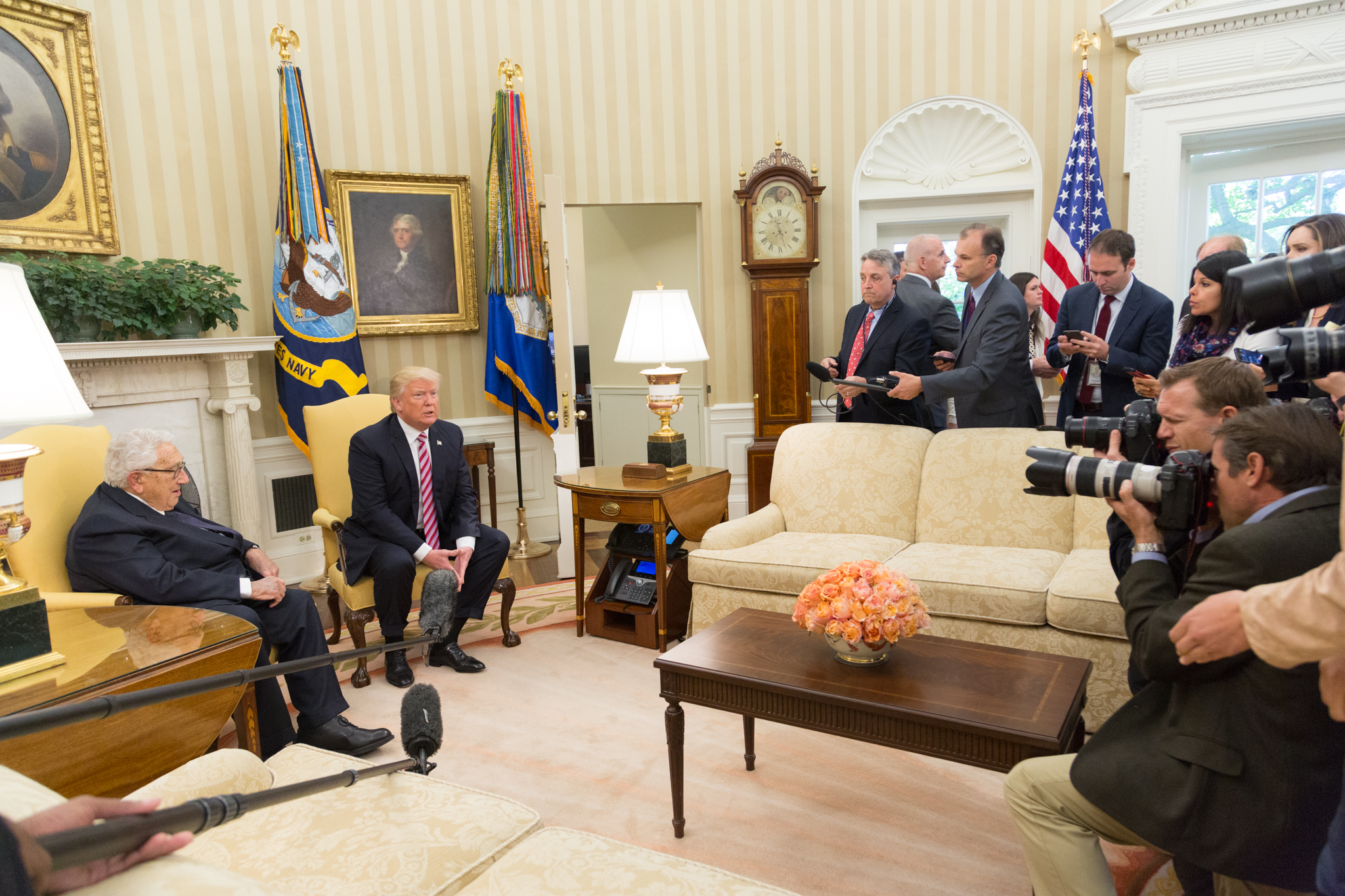
President Donald Trump in a photo opportunity with Henry Kissinger, Richard Nixon's national security adviser – the Seymour clock and northeast door are visible in background.

The clock was mentioned specifically by the former FBI director James Comey, in his written statement to Congress, published the day before his testimony to the Senate Select Committee on Intelligence regarding his being dismissed by President Donald Trump. This very specific and repeated mention of the clock raised increased interest in the clock's own history and caused a minor sensation on social media.

When the door by the grandfather clock closed, and we were alone, the President began by saying, 'I want to talk about Mike Flynn.' ...

After he had spoken for a few minutes about leaks, Reince Priebus leaned in through the door by the grandfather clock and I could see a group of people waiting behind him ...

The President returned briefly to the problem of leaks. I then got up and left out the door by the grandfather clock, making my way through the large group of people waiting there, including Mr. Priebus and the Vice President ...

— James Comey

== See also ==
- Resolute desk
