= Splat (furniture) =

Central part of a chair-back

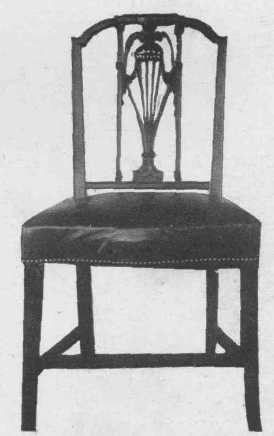
Sheraton chair with elaborately carved splat

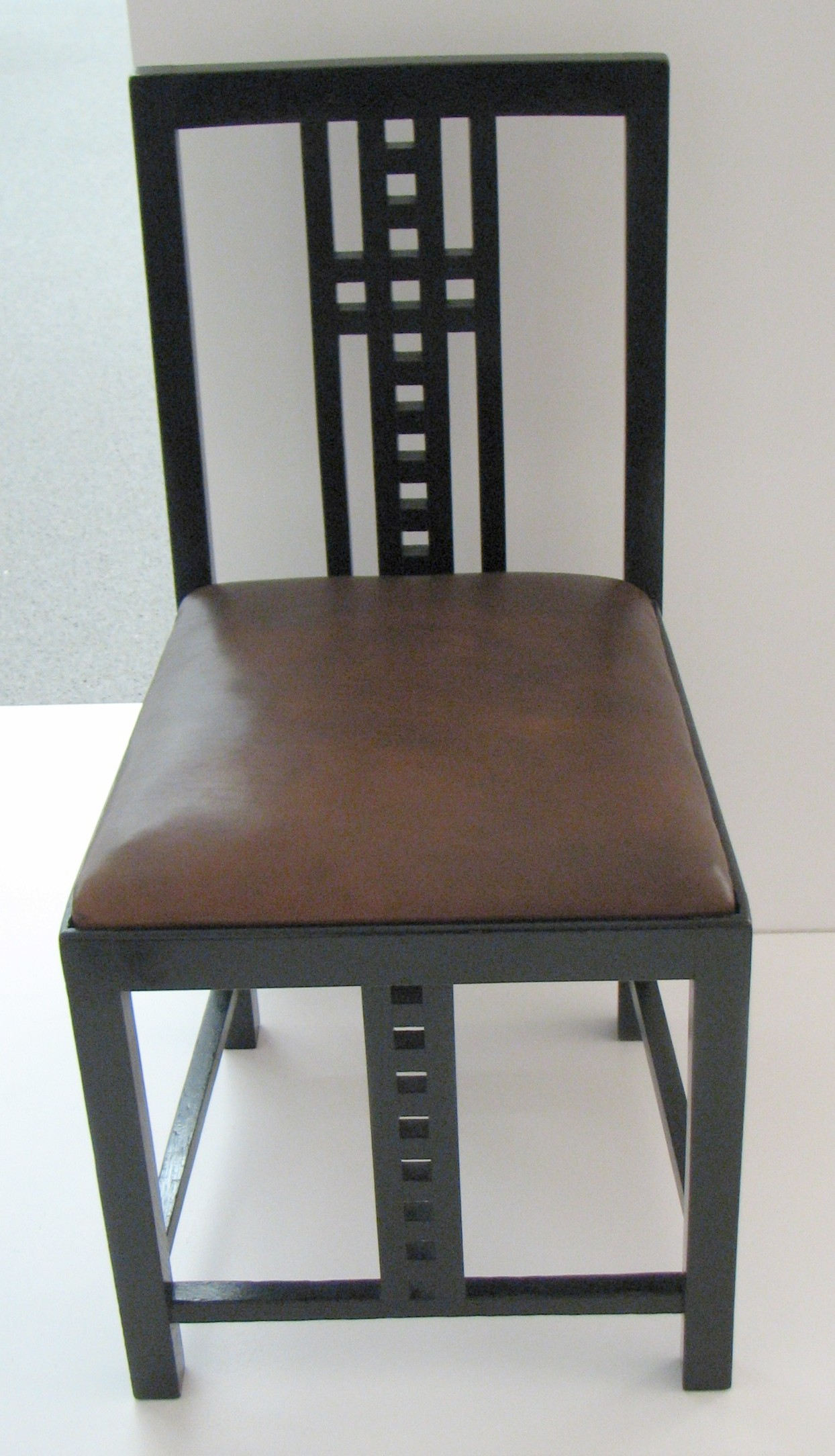
Ernest Taylor chair of 1905 with rectilinear design elements

A splat is the vertical central element of a chair back. Typically this element of a chair is of exposed wood design. The splat is an important element of furniture identification, since its design has a multitude of variations incorporating the themes of different furniture periods. Chippendale's furniture was designed using varied splat details to include Gothic, Chinese, English and some with French details.
