= Thomas Sheraton =

English furniture designer (1751–1806)

- Born: 1751; Stockton-on-Tees
- Died: 22 October 1806 (aged 54–55); London
- Occupation: Furniture designer

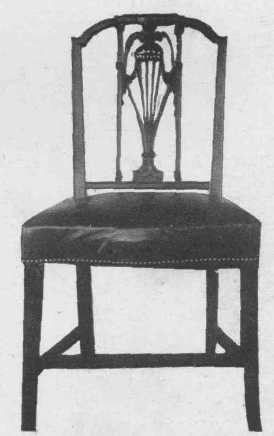
A Sheraton style chair with rectangular back

Thomas Sheraton (1751 – 22 October 1806) was a furniture designer, one of the "big three" English furniture makers of the 18th century, along with Thomas Chippendale and George Hepplewhite. Sheraton gave his name to a style of furniture characterised by a feminine refinement of late Georgian styles and became the most powerful source of inspiration behind the furniture of the late 18th century.

== Biography ==
Sheraton was born in Stockton-on-Tees, County Durham, England – where nowadays there is a pub named after him. He was one of the leaders and preachers of the Stockton Baptist church and also preached elsewhere on his travels. He was apprenticed to a local cabinet maker and continued working as a journeyman cabinet maker until he moved to London in 1790, aged 39. There he set up as professional consultant and teacher, teaching perspective, architecture, and cabinet design for craftsmen. It is not known how he gained either the knowledge or the reputation which enabled him to do this but he appears to have been moderately successful.

Starting in 1791 he published in four volumes The Cabinet Maker's and Upholsterer's Drawing Book. At least six hundred cabinet makers and joiners subscribed to his book and it was immediately widely influential over a large part of the country. During this period he did not have a workshop of his own and it is believed that Sheraton himself never made any of the pieces shown in his books. No piece of furniture has ever been traced to him directly. So a piece of furniture described as being "by Sheraton" refers to the design and not to the maker of the piece.

In 1803 he published The Cabinet Dictionary, a compendium of instructions on the techniques of cabinet and chair making. Then a year before his death, in 1805 he published the first volume of The Cabinet Maker, Upholsterer and General Artist's Encyclopaedia.

Sheraton's name is associated with the styles of furniture fashionable in the 1790s and early 19th century. Many of the designs are based on classical architecture, knowledge of which was an essential part of a designer's technical education. Not all of the drawings are of his own design – he acknowledged that some of them came from works in progress in the workshops of practising cabinet makers – but he was a superb draughtsman and he set his name on the style of the era.

== See also ==
- Luke Vincent Lockwood
- Lyre arm
