= English furniture =

English furniture has developed largely in line with styles in the rest of Northern Europe, but has been interpreted in a distinctive fashion. There were significant regional differences in style, for example between the North Country and the West Country. Salisbury and Norwich were prominent early centres of furniture production.

== Periods in English furniture design ==
- Middle Ages
- Elizabethan
- Jacobean era
- Restoration / Carolean
- William and Mary style
- Queen Anne - see Queen Anne style furniture
- Georgian
- Victorian - see Victorian decorative arts
- Art Deco
- Modernist

== See also ==
- Elizabethan and Jacobean furniture
- Sheraton style
