= Federal furniture =

American furniture in the federal style

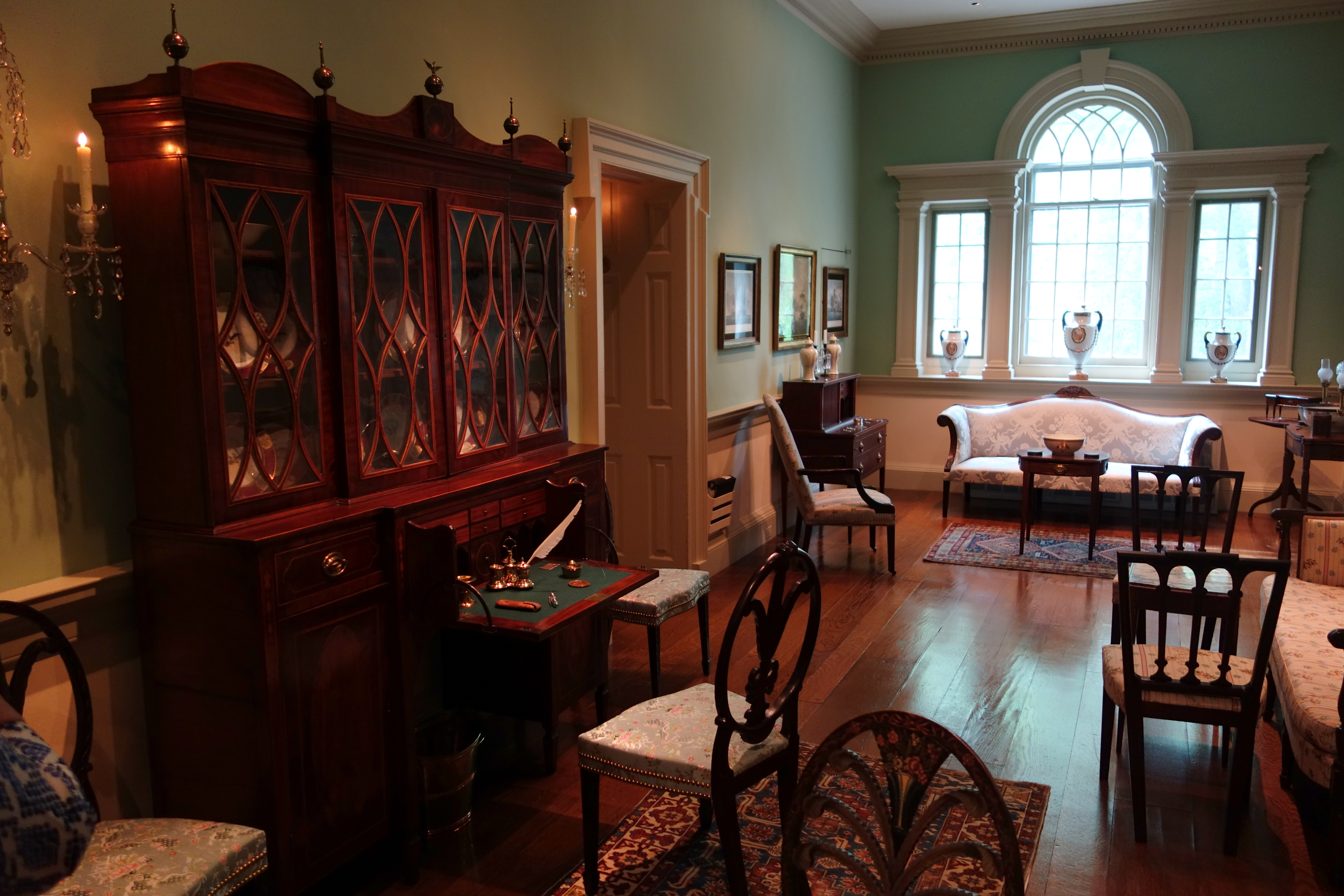
Sitting room furnished with federal furniture, Winterthur Museum.

Federal furniture is American furniture in the federal style, approximately 1789 to 1823. It is named after the Federalist Era in American politics (ca. 1788-1800). Notable furniture makers who worked in this style include John and Thomas Seymour, Duncan Phyfe and Charles-Honoré Lannuier. It was influenced by the Georgian and Adam styles, and was followed by the American Empire style.

Pieces in this style are characterized by their sharply geometric forms, legs that are usually straight rather than curved, contrasting veneers, and geometric inlay patterns on otherwise flat surfaces. Pictorial motifs, when extant, usually reference the new federal government with symbols such as the eagle.

The Oval Office grandfather clock, made between 1795–1805 in Boston by John and Thomas Seymour, is a noted example of the federal style of furniture. The Green Room in the White House perfectly demonstrates this style of furniture.
