= Cabinet-Maker and Upholsterer's Guide =

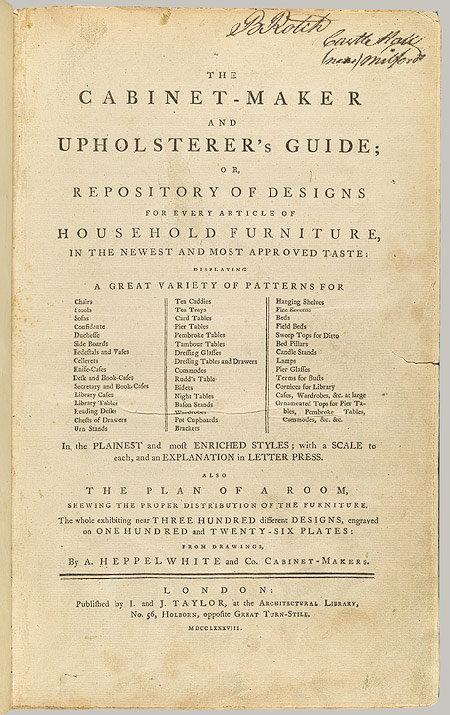

The Cabinet-Maker and Upholsterer's Guide is an eighteenth-century reference book about furniture-making. Many cabinetmakers and furniture designers still use it as a reference for making period furniture or designs inspired by the late 18th century era. Historians of domestic life or the History of Technology use it for establishing context for their research. Original copies are also considered valuable as antiques.

The book was first published in 1788 by Alice Hepplewhite, the widow of the furniture-maker George Hepplewhite. She is referenced on the title page of the first edition as "A. Hepplewhite and co." The subtitle on the original edition is Repository of Designs for Every Article of Household Furniture, in the Newest and Most Approved Taste. This may vary, depending on the edition and the printing.

It is not known if the designs in it are his own or copies from others, since (unlike Chippendale) he was not famous during his life and no piece of furniture can be traced with certainty back to his workshop. The neoclassical designs in it usually have tapered legs and a variety of contrasting veneers. On the whole this kind of furniture has a relatively delicate look. The designs cover the usual chairs, tables, desks and cabinets. They also cover clock cases, library steps and other objects which came out of the cabinet makers' shop of that era. The book was very influential on cabinet makers in the eastern parts of the US during the whole of the 19th century.

A second edition was published in 1788, and a third in 1794. The book continued to be reprinted several times over the centuries. One of the most common editions was made in elephant folio size by the Towse publishing company of New York, in 1942. There is also a Dover Books facsimile edition. At 28cm high the Dover edition is nearly half the size of the 47cm of the elephant folio sized Towse edition and much smaller than the 36cm of the original edition. The Towse edition also has 88 pages of photographs of furniture done according to the designs in the book. The 128 plates are all monochrome, as in the original.
