= List of satirists and satires =

This is an incomplete list of writers, cartoonists and others known for involvement in satire—humorous social criticism. They are grouped by era and listed by year of birth. Included is a list of modern satires.

== Early satirical authors ==
- Aesop (c. 620–560 BCE, Ancient Greece) – Aesop's Fables
- Diogenes (c. 412–600 BCE, Ancient Greece)
- Aristophanes (c. 448–380 BCE, Ancient Greece) – The Frogs, The Birds, and The Clouds
- Gaius Lucilius (c. 180–103 BCE, Roman Republic)
- Horace (65–8 BCE, Roman Republic) – Satires
- Ovid (43 BCE – 17 CE, Roman Republic/Roman Empire) – The Art of Love
- Seneca the Younger (c. 4 BCE – 65 CE, Hispania/Rome) – Apocolocyntosis
- Persius (34–62 CE, Roman Empire)
- Petronius (c. 27–66 CE, Roman Empire) – Satyricon
- Juvenal (1st to early 2nd cc. CE, Roman Empire) – Satires
- Lucian (c. 120–180 CE, Roman Empire)
- Apuleius (c. 123–180 CE, Roman Empire) – The Golden Ass
- Various authors (9th century CE and later) – One Thousand and One Nights, أَلْفُ لَيْلَةٍ وَلَيْلَةٌ

== Medieval, early modern and 18th-century satirists ==
- Godfrey of Winchester (died 1107, England)
- Ubayd Zakani (عبید زاکانی, died 1370, Persia) – Akhlaq al-Ashraf (Ethics of the Aristocracy)
- Giovanni Boccaccio (1313–1375, Italy) – The Decameron
- James Bramston (1694–1743, England) – satirical poet
- Geoffrey Chaucer (c. 1343–1400, England) – The Canterbury Tales
- Sebastian Brant (also Brandt) (1458 – 1521, Strasbourg) – Das Narrenschiff (Ship of Fools)
- Gil Vicente (c. 1465–1536, Portugal)
- Erasmus (1466–1536, Burgundian Netherlands/Switzerland) – The Praise of Folly
- François Rabelais (c. 1493–1553, France) – Gargantua and Pantagruel
- Various authors (16th century CE and later, Italy) – Talking statues of Rome
- Miguel de Cervantes (1547–1616, Spain) – Don Quixote
- Luis de Góngora (1561–1627, Spain)
- William Shakespeare (1564–1616, England) – Sonnet 130
- Francisco de Quevedo (1580–1645, Spain)
- Juan de Tassis, 2nd Count of Villamediana (1582–1622, Spain)
- Martin Marprelate (true identity unknown, fl. 1588–1589, England) – Marprelate tracts
- Samuel Butler (1612–1680, England) – Hudibras
- Molière (1622–1673, France) – Le Malade imaginaire
- Margaret Cavendish, Duchess of Newcastle-upon-Tyne (1623–1673, England)
- John Wilmot, 2nd Earl of Rochester (1647–1680, England)
- Jonathan Swift (1667–1745, Ireland/England) – Gulliver's Travels, A Modest Proposal, A Tale of a Tub
- Alicia D'Anvers [née Clarke] (baptised 1668 – 1725, England) – Academia, or, The Humours of the University of Oxford, 1691; The Oxford-Act, 1693
- John Gay (1685–1732, England) – The Beggar's Opera
- Alexander Pope (1688–1744, England)
- Voltaire (1694–1778, France) – Candide
- James Bramston (1694–1744, England)
- William Hogarth (1697–1764, England) – Beer Street and Gin Lane
- Nicholas Amhurst (1697–1742, England)
- David Raphael ben Abraham Polido (fl. 17th and 18th cc.)
- Henry Fielding (1707–1754, England)
- Laurence Sterne (1713–1768, Ireland/England) – The Life and Opinions of Tristram Shandy, Gentleman
- James Beresford (1764–1840, England) – The Miseries of Human Life
- Ivan Krylov (1769–1844, Russia)
- Jane Austen (1775–1817, England) – Love and Freindship
- Thomas Love Peacock (1785–1866, England) – Nightmare Abbey, Crochet Castle
- Eaton Stannard Barrett (1786–1820, Ireland) – The Heroine
- Charles Etienne Boniface (1787–1853, France/South Africa) – De Nieuwe Ridderorde of De Temperantisten (in Dutch, The New Knighthood or the Temperance Societies)
- Giuseppe Gioachino Belli – (1791–1863, Italy)
- Benjamin Franklin - (1706-1790, US) - Silence Dogood Letters, On Titles of Honor, The Busy-Body Letters, A Witch Trial at Mount Holly, Poor Richard's Almanack, Join, or Die, Felons and Rattlesnakes, The Speech of Polly Baker, On the Slave-Trade

== Modern satirists (born 1800–1900) ==
- Evan Bevan (1803–1866, Wales) – satirical poetry in Welsh
- Nikolai Gogol (1809–1852, Russia) – The Government Inspector, Dead Souls
- Edgar Allan Poe (1809–1849, US) – The Man That Was Used Up, A Predicament, Never Bet the Devil Your Head
- William Makepeace Thackeray (1811–1863, England) – Vanity Fair
- Charles Dickens (1812–1870, England) – Hard Times, A Tale of Two Cities
- Eugène Edine Pottier (1816–1887, France)
- James Russell Lowell (1819–1891, US) – A Fable for Critics
- George Derby, also known as John P. Squibob and John Phoenix (1823–1861, US)
- Mikhail Saltykov-Shchedrin (1826–1889, Russia)
- Lewis Carroll (1832–1898, England) – Alice in Wonderland, Through the Looking Glass
- Samuel Butler (1835–1902, England) – Erewhon
- Mark Twain (1835–1910, US) – Adventures of Huckleberry Finn, A Connecticut Yankee in King Arthur's Court, The Celebrated Jumping Frog of Calaveras County
- W. S. Gilbert (1836–1911, England)
- Narushima Ryūhoku (成島柳北, 1837–1884, Japan)
- Thomas Nast (1840–1902, US)
- Ambrose Bierce (1842 – c. 1914, US) – The Devil's Dictionary
- Anatole France (1844–1924, France)
- José Maria de Eça de Queirós (1845–1900, Portugal)
- Oscar Wilde (1854–1900, Ireland/England) – The Importance of Being Earnest
- George Bernard Shaw (1856–1950, England)
- Jerome K. Jerome (1859–1927, England) – Three Men in a Boat, Idle Thoughts of an Idle Fellow
- Anton Chekhov (1860–1904, Russia) – The Lady with the Dog
- O. Henry (1862–1910, US) short story writer known for surprise endings, namesake of the O. Henry Award
- Jalil Mammadguluzadeh (1866–1931, Azerbaijan)
- Lakshminath Bezbaroa (1868–1938, India, writing in Assamese)
- Saki, also known as H. H. Munro (1870–1916, England)
- Trilussa (1873–1950, Italy)
- Alfred Jarry (1873–1907, France) – Ubu Roi
- Radoje Domanović (1873–1908, Serbia)
- Iraj Mirza (ایرج میرزا, 1874–1926, Iran)
- Karl Kraus (1874–1936, Austria)
- Will Rogers (1879–1935, US)
- James Branch Cabell (1879–1958, US)
- Ali-Akbar Dehkhoda (علی‌اکبر دهخدا, 1879–1959, Iran)
- H. L. Mencken (1880–1956, US) – cultural critic and author
- Arkady Averchenko (1881–1925, Russia)
- P. G. Wodehouse (1881–1975, England/US)
- Wyndham Lewis (1882–1957, England)
- Jaroslav Hašek (1883–1923, Austria-Hungary/Czechoslovakia) – The Good Soldier Švejk
- Oscar Cesare (1885–1948, Sweden/US)
- Charlie Chaplin (1889-1977, England) – Modern Times, The Great Dictator, Monsieur Verdoux
- Kurt Tucholsky (1890–1935, Germany)
- Mikhail Bulgakov (1891–1940, Russia/Soviet Union) – Heart of a Dog, The Master and Margarita
- Dorothy Parker (1893–1967, US) satirical writer of humorous short stories, poetry and book reviews
- Vladimir Mayakovsky (1893–1930, Russia/Soviet Union)
- Aldous Huxley (1894–1963) – Point Counter Point, Brave New World
- James Thurber (1894-1961, US) – "The Secret Life of Walter Mitty"
- Mikhail Zoshchenko (1894–1958, Soviet Union)
- Josep Pla (1897–1981, Spain [Catalonia])
- Ilf and Petrov: Ilya Ilf (1897–1937, Soviet Union) and Yevgeni Petrov (1903–1942, Soviet Union) – The Twelve Chairs, The Little Golden Calf
- Yury Olesha (1899–1960, Soviet Union) – Three Fat Men, Envy

== Modern satirists (born 1900–1930) ==
- Stella Gibbons (1902–1989, England) – author of comic novel Cold Comfort Farm
- Evelyn Waugh (1903–1966, England) – Brideshead Revisited, Decline and Fall, Scoop
- George Orwell (1903–1950, England) – Animal Farm, Nineteen Eighty-Four
- Malcolm Muggeridge (1903–1990, England)
- Dr. Seuss (1904–1991, US) – The Lorax (1971), The Butter Battle Book (1984)
- Kurt Kusenberg (1904–1983, Germany)
- Daniil Kharms (1905–1942, Russia/USSR)
- H. F. Ellis (1907–2000, England) – The Papers of A. J. Wentworth, B.A., 1949
- Jean Effel (1908–1982, France) – cartoonist, author of the cartoon cycle The Creation of the World
- Natyaguru Nurul Momen (1908-1990, Bangladesh) - pioneer satirist & playwright, author of We are Brothers All, Lest we Forget, Forbidden Pleasures, Bahurupa, Is Law an Ass etc.
- Al Capp (1909–1979, US)
- Arkady Raikin (1911–1987, Russia/USSR) – stand-up comedian
- Aubrey Menen (1912–1989, Britain, India) – satirist, novelist and philosopher
- Walt Kelly (1913–1973, US)
- Anthony Burgess (1917–1993, England) – A Clockwork Orange
- Warrington Colescott (1921–2018, US)
- Kurt Vonnegut (1922–2007, US) – Slaughterhouse-Five, Breakfast of Champions, Cat's Cradle
- Lenny Bruce (1925–1966, US) – stand-up comedian
- Joseph Heller (1923–1999, US) – Catch-22
- Art Buchwald (1924–2007) – political humor column in The Washington Post
- Terry Southern (1924–1995, US) – The Magic Christian, Dr. Strangelove
- Günter Grass (1927–2015, Germany) – The Tin Drum, Cat and Mouse
- Stanley Kubrick (1928–1999, US) – Dr. Strangelove
- Harvey Kurtzman (1924–1993, US)
- Tom Lehrer (1928–2025, US) – That Was the Year That Was
- Jules Feiffer (1929, US) – satirical cartoonist who wrote the original play and screenplay for Little Murders
- Ray Bradbury (US)
- William S. Burroughs (US) – Naked Lunch
- Dario Fo (Italy)
- Flannery O'Connor (US)
- C. Northcote Parkinson (England)
- Anna Russell (England/Canada)
- Gore Vidal (US) – Myra Breckinridge
- Mel Brooks (US) – The Producers, Blazing Saddles, Young Frankenstein
- Erma Bombeck (1927, US)
- Allan Sherman (1924–1973, US) – musician, parodist, television producer, voice actor
- Stan Freberg (1926, US) – musician, parodist, voice actor
- Brian O'Nolan (1911–1966, Ireland) – At Swim-Two-Birds (as Flann O'Brien)
- Ephraim Kishon (1924, Israel)
- Jerry Lewis (1926-2017) (US) – comedian, screenwriter, director

== Contemporary satirists (born 1930–1960) ==
- Joey Skaggs (born 1945, US) - artist and media satirist
- Mordecai Richler (1931–2001, Canada)
- Tom Wolfe (born 1931, US) – The Bonfire of the Vanities
- Vladimir Voinovich (born 1932, Soviet Union/Russia) – The Life and Extraordinary Adventures of Private Ivan Chonkin, Moscow 2042
- Robert Anton Wilson (1932–2007, US) – The Illuminatus! Trilogy
- Barry Humphries (1934–2023, Australia) – My Gorgeous Life, The Life and Death of Sandy Stone, stage shows
- Jonathan Miller (1934–2019, England)
- Alan Bennett (born 1934, England)
- Mykhailo Zhvanetskyi (born 1934, Soviet Union/Russia)
- Dudley Moore (1935–2002, England)
- David Lodge (born 1935, US) – author of "Campus Trilogy"
- Woody Allen (born 1935, US)
- Thomas Pynchon (born 1937, US) – V., The Crying of Lot 49, Gravity's Rainbow
- Richard Ingrams (born 1937, England)
- John Kennedy O'Toole (born 1937, US)
- George Carlin (1937–2008, US) – stand-up comedian
- Peter Cook (1937–1995, England) – of the Satire boom, Beyond the Fringe
- Eleanor Bron (born 1938, England)
- David Frost (1939–2013, England)
- Grigori Gorin (1940–2000, Soviet Union/Russia)
- Frank Zappa (1940–1993, US) – We're Only in It for the Money, Cruising with Ruben and the Jets
- Sergei Dovlatov (1941–1990, Soviet Union/Russia)
- Kioumars Saberi Foumani (کیومرث صابری فومنی, 1941–2004, Iran)
- Randy Newman (born 1943, US) - Sail Away, Good Old Boys
- Neil Innes (1944–2019, England) – former Bonzo Dog Doo-Dah Band founder and member of The Rutles. Writer of satirical songs and books
- Gennady Khazanov (born 1945, Soviet Union/Russia) – stand-up comedian
- Luba Goy (born 1945, Canada)
- Roger Abbott (born 1946, Canada) – sketch comedian.
- Lewis Grizzard (born 1946, US)
- Sue Townsend (1946–2014, England) – Adrian Mole
- Don Ferguson (born 1946, Canada)
- Jonathan Meades (born 1947, England) – writer, broadcaster and satirist
- P.J. O'Rourke (1947-2022, US)
- Terry Pratchett (1948–2015) – humorist and fantasy novelist, The Discworld book series
- Lewis Black (born 1948, US) – stand-up comic, The Daily Show
- Mikhail Zadornov (born 1948, Soviet Union/Russia)
- Garry Trudeau (born 1948, US)
- Jaafar Abbas (living, Sudan)
- Christopher Guest (born 1948, US) – This Is Spinal Tap, Waiting for Guffman
- Georg Schramm (born 1949, Germany) – Scheibenwischer, Neues aus der Anstalt, kabarett artist
- Gary Larson (born 1950, US) – cartoonist
- Fran Lebowitz (born 1950, US) – The Fran Lebowitz Reader, Public Speaking (film) – NYC public intellectual
- Bailey White (born 1950, US)
- Joe Queenan (born 1950, US)
- Steve Bell (born 1951, England)
- Bill Bryson (born 1951, US)
- Al Franken (born 1951, US)
- Douglas Adams (1952–2001, England) – The Hitchhiker's Guide to the Galaxy
- Mary Walsh (born 1952, Canada)
- Phil Hendrie (born 1952, US) – radio host of The Phil Hendrie Show
- Robert Zubrin (born 1952, US)
- Christopher Buckley (born 1952) – Thank You for Smoking, The White House Mess
- Carl Hiaasen (born 1953) – Tourist Season, Double Whammy, Basket Case, Skinny Dip
- Stoney Burke (born 1953, US)
- Elvis Costello (born 1954) – Oliver's Army, Pump It Up
- Louis de Bernières (born 1954, UK) – Latin America Trilogy: The War of Don Emmanuel's Nether Parts, Señor Vivo and the Coca Lord, The Troublesome Offspring of Cardinal Guzman
- Matt Groening (born 1954, US) – The Simpsons, Futurama
- George C. Wolfe (born 1954, US) – The Colored Museum
- Howard Stern (born 1954, US)
- Jaspal Bhatti (1955–2012, India)
- Cathy Jones (born 1955, Canada)
- Bill Maher (born 1956, US) – Real Time with Bill Maher
- Percival Everett (born 1956, US)
- Ziad Rahbani (زياد الرحباني, born 1956, Lebanon)
- David Sedaris (born 1956, US) – Naked, Me Talk Pretty One Day
- Craig Brown (born 1957, UK)
- Scott Adams (born 1957, US) – Dilbert
- Steve Taylor (born 1957) – On the Fritz, I Predict 1990
- Stephen Fry (born 1957, England)
- Christopher Moore (born 1957, US)
- Victor Shenderovich (born 1958, Russia)
- Ebrahim Nabavi (سید ابراهیم نبوی, born 1958, Iran), winner of Prince Claus Award (2005)
- Bill Watterson (born 1958, US) – cartoonist, Calvin and Hobbes
- Jello Biafra (born 1958, US)
- George Saunders (born 1958, US) – author of CivilWarLand In Bad Decline, Tenth of December and Lincoln in the Bardo.
- Wayne Federman (born 1959, US)
- "Weird Al" Yankovic (born 1959, US)
- Hugh Laurie (born 1959, England)
- Jeffrey Morgan (living, Canada) – CREEM, Metro Times
- Denis Leary (born 1957, US)

== Contemporary satirists (born 1960–present) ==
In alphabetical order (many birth dates not known):

- Jacob M. Appel (US, born 1973) – playwright (Causa Mortis, Arborophilia)
- Michael "Atters" Attree (born 1965, UK)
- Max Barry (born 1973, Australia) – author
- Paul Beatty (born 1962, US) – (The White Boy Shuffle, The Sellout)
- Nigel Blackwell (living, UK) – Half Man Half Biscuit
- Jan Böhmermann (born 1981, Germany)
- Charlie Brooker (born 1971, UK) – Nathan Barley
- Bo Burnham (born 1990, US) – comedian and musician
- Dave Chappelle (born 1973, US) – stand-up comedian, Chappelle's Show
- David Cross (born 1964, US) – Mr. Show, Arrested Development
- Sacha Baron Cohen (born 1971) – Borat, Da Ali G Show
- Stephen Colbert (born 1964, US) – The Colbert Report, The Daily Show
- Sarah Cooper (born 1977, US) – blogger, vlogger, author, comedian
- Douglas Coupland (born 1961, Canada) – Generation X: Tales for an Accelerated Culture
- Scott Dikkers (born 1965, US) – comedy writer and speaker
- Bret Easton Ellis (born 1964, US) – screenwriter and director
- Will Franken (born 1973, USA) - American character comedian and satirist.
- Ricky Gervais (born 1961, UK) – comedian, creator of The Office (British TV series)
- Sabina Guzzanti (born 1963, Italy) – satirist and writer
- Bill Hicks (1961–1994, US) – stand-up comedian
- Mishu Hilmy (living, US) – Good Morning Gitmo
- Ian Hislop (born 1960, UK) – Private Eye
- Jessica Holmes (born 1973, Canada) – comedian and actress
- Armando Iannucci (born 1963, UK) – Brass Eye, The Day Today
- Mike Judge (born 1962, US) – creator of Beavis and Butt-Head and King of the Hill
- Elnathan John (born 1982, Nigeria) — Be(com)ing Nigerian: A Guide
- Kennedy (born 1972, US) – radio personality and author
- Hari Kondabolu (born 1982, US) – stand-up comic and film-maker
- Erik Larsen (born 1962, US) – "Savage Dragon" comic book
- Craig Lauzon (living, Canada) – comedian and caricaturist
- Stewart Lee (born 1968, UK) – stand-up comedian and director
- Victor Lewis-Smith (living, UK) – TV Offal
- Chris Lilley (born 1974, Australia) – Summer Heights High, We Can Be Heroes: Finding The Australian of the Year
- Daniele Luttazzi (born 1961, Italy) – satirist and songwriter
- Maddox (born 1978, US) – website The Best Page in the Universe
- Seth MacFarlane (born 1973, US) – Family Guy
- Aaron McGruder (US) – The Boondocks (comic strip), The Boondocks (TV series)
- Rick Mercer (born 1969, Canada) – Rick Mercer Report
- Tim Minchin (born 1975, Australia) – comedian and musician
- Mark Morford (living, US) – Notes and Errata, San Francisco Chronicle, SF Gate
- Chris Morris (born 1965, UK) – Brass Eye, The Day Today
- Gregory Motton (born 1961, UK) – playwright and author
- The Moustache Brothers (Myanmar) – screwball comedy and dance
- Bob Odenkirk (born 1962, US) – Mr. Show, Saturday Night Live, The Larry Sanders Show
- John Oliver (born 1977, England) – Last Week Tonight with John Oliver
- Chuck Palahniuk (born 1962, US) – Fight Club and Choke
- Alan Park (born 1962, Canada) – comedian and satirist
- Trey Parker (born 1969, US) – South Park, Team America: World Police, The Book of Mormon
- Alexandra Petri (born 1988, US) – author and columnist
- Mark A. Rayner (living, Canada) – satirist and fiction writer
- Pablo Reyes Jr. (born 1989, US) – website The Daily Currant and Huzlers
- Celia Rivenbark (living, US) – columnist and author
- Joe Rogan (born 1967, US) – comedian and podcast pioneer
- Eric Schwartz (living, US) – folk singer and satirist
- Andrew Shaffer (living, US) – author
- Amy Sedaris (born 1961, US) – actress and comedian
- Sarah Silverman (born 1970, US) – stand-up comedian, The Sarah Silverman Program
- Martin Sonneborn (born 1965, Germany) – political jokester and satirist
- Jon Stewart (born 1962, US) – The Daily Show
- Matt Stone (born 1971, US) – South Park, The Book of Mormon
- Vermin Supreme (born 1961, US) – performance artist, comedian and political satirist
- Greg Thomey (born 1961, Canada) – comedian and playwright
- David Thorne (living, Australia) – humorist and satirist
- Andrew Unger, (living, Canada) – Mennonite satirist
- Jhonen Vasquez (born 1974, US) – Johnny the Homicidal Maniac, Squee
- Oliver Welke (born 1966, Germany) - heute-show
- Mark Whitney (born 1959, US) – satirist and comedian
- Howard X, (living, Hong Kong, Australia) – political satirist, musician, professional impersonator of Kim Jong-un
- Bassem Youssef (باسم رأفت محمد يوسف, born 1974, Egypt) – comedian
- Rucka Rucka Ali (born 1987, Israel) – political satirist, song parody maker

== Notable satires in contemporary popular culture ==
In modern culture, much satire is often the work of several individuals collectively, as in magazines and television. Hence the following list.

=== Print ===
- Astérix (French comic strip, satirizing both the Roman Empire era as well as 20th century life)
- Benchley (US comic strip created by Mort Drucker and Jerry Dumas, satirizing Ronald Reagan and American culture)
- Bone (US comic strip)
- The Boondocks (US comic strip, satirizing African-American culture)
- Le Canard enchaîné (weekly French satirical newspaper)
- Charlie Hebdo (weekly French satirical magazine)
- The Chaser (Australian newspaper and TV shows)
- Cho Ramaswamy (Thuglak – Tamil magazine)
- Craposyncrasies (Persian book)
- Dilbert (US comic strip)
- The Donald Duck and Uncle Scrooge comics by Carl Barks
- Doonesbury (US comic strip)
- The Fabulous Furry Freak Brothers (US comic strip)
- Faux Faulkner contest (annually published in Hemispheres magazine until 2005)
- Fritz the Cat by Robert Crumb
- Humor Times (monthly US magazine)
- Idées noires (Belgian comic strip)
- Li'l Abner (US comic strip)
- Life in Hell (US comic strip)
- Mad (American magazine)
- Mr. Natural by Robert Crumb
- Nero (Belgian comic strip)
- The New Yorker (Shouts and Murmurs)
- The Onion (US satirical newspaper)
- Peanuts (US comic strip)
- Pogo (US comic strip)
- Private Eye (UK magazine)
- The Inconsequential (UK magazine)
- The Second Supper (US magazine)
- The Tart (Fortnightly UK newspaper)
- The Adventures of Tintin (Belgian comic strip)
- Titanic (German magazine)
- Tom Puss (Dutch comic strip)
- Watchmen (American comic book series)

=== Television and radio ===
- The Simpsons and Futurama (Matt Groening)
- Howard Stern (radio personality "The Howard Stern Show")
- The Daily Show with Jon Stewart (US Talk Show)
- The Colbert Report (US Talk Show)
- The Day Today (UK TV news parody by Chris Morris)
- Brass Eye (UK current affairs TV-show parody by Chris Morris)
- On the Hour (UK news radio parody by Chris Morris)
- TV Offal (UK TV critique show by Victor Lewis-Smith)
- This Hour Has 22 Minutes (Canadian TV show)
- South Park (Trey Parker and Matt Stone)
- The Chaser (Australian newspaper and TV shows)
- Facelift (New Zealand Political show)
- Spitting Image (UK TV show famous for its puppets of celebrities)
- Yes Minister (also "Yes, Prime Minister" – UK TV show satirising government)
- Kukly (Dolls, 1994–2002) – Russian satirical puppet show
- Fitil (Fuse) – Soviet television satirical/comedy short film series
- Nip/Tuck (Ryan Murphy)
- Have I Got News For You – Long running UK TV panel show
- Nathan Barley – 2005 UK TV satire by Chris Morris and Charlie Brooker.
- The Chaser's War on Everything – Australian satire with an emphasis on attacking 'everyone'.
- Seinfeld (Jerry Seinfeld)
- Royal Canadian Air Farce (1993–2007) (Don Ferguson, Roger Abbott, Luba Goy)
- Air Farce Live (2007–present) (Don Ferguson, Roger Abbott, Luba Goy)
- Monty Python's Flying Circus
- Phil Hendrie (radio personality "The Phil Hendrie Show")
- Mock the Week – UK TV comedy panel show
- The Larry Sanders Show – (Garry Shandling)
- 30 Rock – (Tina Fey)
- Glenn Martin, DDS – A Nick@Nite show
- Episodes – David Crane
- Better Off Ted – (Victor Fresco)
- Onion News Network
- The Boondocks – (Aaron McGruder)
- heute-show (German TV series)
- Servant of the People (2015 TV series) — Ukrainian political satire comedy TV series starring Volodymyr Zelenskyy
- The Amazing World of Gumball – Ben Bocquelet
- Family Guy – (Seth MacFarlane)
- On Cinema at the Cinema – (Tim Heidecke), Gregg Turkington)
- The Fresh Prince of Bel-Air – (Andy Borowitz and Susan Borowitz)

=== Music ===
- The Cover of "Rolling Stone" a satirical lament by Dr. Hook & the Medicine Show.
- "White America" is a satirical song by Eminem It is about his impact in rap and the impact of rap in the white communities.
- "Mercedes Benz" is a McClure-Joplin song sung by Janis Joplin
- Culturcide's album Tacky Souvenirs of Pre-Revolutionary America overdubbed new, satirical lyrics onto such pop hits as "We Are the World".
- Vaporwave, a satirical music genre with anarcho-capitalist and cyberpunk overtones dedicated to (anti-)consumerism.
- Mark Russell is an American political satirist known for his many appearances on PBS
- Peter Gabriel's song The Barry Williams Show satirizes talk shows which showcase domestic topics of a taboo or shocking nature (and the viewing public's fascination with such content).
- Chumbawamba have consistently used satire to make political points throughout their musical career.
- Pink Floyd's albums Animals and The Dark Side of the Moon are conceptual and satirical albums.
- The Lonely Island is a satirical music group known for their work on Saturday Night Live.
- Trey Parker, Robert Lopez and Matt Stone's Tony-sweeping Broadway show The Book of Mormon (musical) satirizes the applicability of first-world religion to third-world problems.
- The Dead Milkmen is a satirical punk rock/cowpunk band from the early 1980s.
- Ben Folds, a rock pianist, and his group, Ben Folds Five, have multiple songs including satirical elements. Some of them being, "Underground", "Sports and Wine", and "Rock Star".
- Dead Kennedys, an American punk band, often used satire in their songs, most notably Kill the Poor.
- Frank Zappa and the Mothers of Invention's We're Only in It for the Money, a satire of flower power and conservative America.

=== Film ===
- Blazing Saddles, a 1974 comedy movie directed by Mel Brooks, satirizing racism
- Casino Royale, a 1967 surrealistic satire on the James Bond series and the entire spy genre.
- Get Out
- This Is Spinal Tap, a satire on heavy metal culture and "rockumentaries"
- The Very Same Munchhausen, a 1979 satire of the late Soviet society
- Clueless
- American Beauty, a 1999 satire of life in the suburbs
- Thank You for Smoking
- Team America: World Police is a 2004 film satirizing Hollywood action flicks as well as post-9/11 American foreign policy.
- Wag the Dog
- The Rules of Attraction
- Best in Show
- I Heart Huckabees
- Starship Troopers
- Scary Movie
- Donald Trump's The Art of the Deal: The Movie
- Dr. Strangelove
- Planet of the Apes
- South Park: Bigger, Longer & Uncut, a film satirizing censorship
- Network
- Otaku no Video, a 1993 anime satirizing the otaku subculture
- Adaptation.
- Brazil
- S.O.B., a satire on Hollywood.
- Election
- Not Another Teen Movie, a satire of the teen film genre
- Harold & Kumar Go to White Castle
- Harold & Kumar Escape from Guantanamo Bay
- Citizen Ruth
- The Hospital
- Weapons of Mass Distraction
- Little Children
- Bulworth
- Man Bites Dog
- The Simpsons Movie
- Smile, a satire of beauty pageants and small-town life
- Bob Roberts
- War, Inc.
- Britannia Hospital
- Fight Club, a dark satire on consumerism, cults, and extremism
- American Psycho
- Tropic Thunder
- Simon, satirical commentary on the effects of mass media in pop culture
- American History X satirizes race/racism in a contemporary setting
- They Live
- Land of the Dead, a satire of post-9/11 America state and of the Bush administration
- The Wicker Man, a satire on cults and religion
- The Great Dictator, a satire on Adolf Hitler
- Monty Python's Life of Brian, a satire on miscommunication, religion and Christianity
- The Player, a satire of Hollywood, directed by Robert Altman
- In the Loop, a satire of the 2003 invasion of Iraq
- Elvis Gratton, a French Canadian/Québécois series depicting a satirical federalist
- Fubar
- The Man Who Knew Too Little

=== Video games ===
- Fallout
- Fallout 2
- Fallout 3
- Fallout: New Vegas
- Fallout 4
- Dead Rising (デッドライジング, Deddo Raijingu), a satire on US consumer culture
- Dead Rising 2: Off the Record (デッドライジング2 オフ・ザ・レコード, Deddo Raijingu 2: Ofu za rekōdo), a satire on US consumer culture
- Grand Theft Auto
- Crash: Mind over Mutant

=== Internet ===
- Adequacy.org
- The Babylon Bee (Christian satire)
- BBspot
- The Best Page In The Universe
- BuyTigers.com
- Coconut Kelz (South African satirical video blogger)
- The Daily Mash (U.K. satirical news website)
- The Daily Bonnet (Mennonite satire website)
- Faking News (Indian news satire website)
- The Hard Times
- Huzlers
- Landover Baptist Church (US website satirizing Fundamentalist Christians)
- Latma
- McSweeney's Internet Tendency
- National Report
- Jeremy Nell (South African cartoonist)
- NewsBiscuit
- The Onion
- Pat Condell
- Reductress
- ScrappleFace
- Sorry Everybody
- The Second Supper
- The UnReal Times (Indian news satire website)
- Uncyclopedia (satirical parody of Wikipedia)
- Vote for the Worst

== See also ==
- List of satirical news websites
