= Regine's =

Defunct nightclub in New York City

Coordinates: 40°45′48″N 73°58′13″W

Regine's was a nightclub at 69 East 59th Street in Midtown Manhattan, New York City. It was operated by Régine Zylberberg from 1976 to 1991. She also opened a bistro alongside the nightclub called Cafe Reginette.

== History ==
In 1975, French singer Régine Zylberberg, known mononymously as Régine, purchased a penthouse suite at the Delmonico Hotel on Park Avenue and 59th Street in New York. In 1976, she opened Regine's, a restaurant and discotheque, on the ground floor of the hotel. It cost $700,000 to open Regine's; she was able to finance the venture with the help of a Rothschild bank-owned company and an international insurance provider.

Regine's was designed by interior designer Alberto Pinto. The nightclubs was characterized by opulent Art Deco fretwork, rooms filled with mirrors, and brocade couches, and snake-wrapped lamps. There was a heart-shaped neon sculpture by artist Ron Ferri built into a lit dance floor, which Regine referred to as "the Heart of New York." A cover charge of $10 per person was applicable, or tables could be reserved in advance for a yearly flat fee of $500 to $600. Two-weekly afternoon dancing sessions at Regine's, as well as access to Régine's nightclubs in Paris, Monte Carlo, Rio, and Bahia, were additional benefits.

The preopening of Regine's was a benefit for the Association of American Dance Companies on March 15, 1976. The nightclub served food under the direction of French chef Michel Guérard for the opening. There was a fashion show introducing Regine's line of Prêt-à-danser dresses. Regine's opened to the public on May 10, 1976.

In 1977, she opened a bistro next door called Cafe Reginette. This was also an attempt to attract more patrons from the bustling Studio 54. Cafe Reginette was less formal than Regine's and the meals were not as expensive.

In a time when Studio 54 was a dance mecca that attracted celebrities, it was difficult for Regine to compete in the early years so she consulted with pop artist Andy Warhol at The Factory. Warhol was a fixture in New York nightlife. He documented his activities in his diary and would often visit Regine's. In a February 28, 1978 diary entry, Warhol said "Studio 54 is making Regine desperate."

Bob Colacello, former editor-in-chief at Interview magazine, wrote in his book that "because she had always been so nice to us in Paris and Monte Carlo—and because she agreed to his suggestion to have her portrait done, in exchange for a $40,000 credit at her clubs," they held a star-studded dinner at Cafe Reginette honoring Interview's March 1978 covergirl, Margaret Trudeau, in February 1978. However, after the dinner, Colacello notes that instead of going next door to Regine's nightclub, they guest went over to Studio 54.

In March 1978, writer Fran Lebowitz had a cocktail party at Cafe Reginette for the release of her first book Metropolitan Life.

In May 1978, film producer Federico De Laurentiis had a wrap party for the movie King of the Gypsies (1978) at Cafe Reginette.

In 1986, about 80 waiters, bartenders, and chefs went on strike as a result of the management's disregard for a citywide contract that the hotel workers union had negotiated the previous year. The labor dispute was settled in 1987, but the number of patrons had decreased, and in 1991, Regine's was closed.
