= Pablo Reyes (disambiguation) =

Pablo Reyes (born 1993) is an American baseball player.

Pablo Reyes may also refer to:

- Pablo Reyes Jr., Mexican writer and prankster
- Pablo Reyes, several times mayor of Choloma, Honduras
- Pablo Reyes, a fictional character in three films played by Fernando Sancho
- Paul "Pablo" Reyes, member of the band Gipsy Kings

== See also ==
- Juan Pablo Reyes (born 1985), Ecuadorian footballer
