= Pretend It's a City =

2021 documentary series

- Genre: Documentary; Biography
- Directed by: Martin Scorsese
- Country of origin: United States
- Original language: English
- No. of seasons: 1
- No. of episodes: 7

Production
- Executive producers: Fran Lebowitz; Josh Porter; Martin Scorsese; David Tedeschi; Ted Griffin; Emma Tillinger Koskoff; Margaret Bodde
- Cinematography: Ellen Kuras
- Editors: David Tedeschi; Damian Rodriguez
- Running time: 26-31 minutes

Original release
- Network: Netflix
- Release: January 8, 2021

Pretend It's a City is a 2021 American documentary series directed by Martin Scorsese featuring interviews and conversations between Scorsese and Fran Lebowitz. The series was released on January 8, 2021, on Netflix.

== Premise ==
Lebowitz talks to her friend Scorsese about living in New York City. The film is interspersed with clips from archived television interviews and video footage of Lebowitz and Scorsese walking around the city.

== Production ==
The New York Times called Pretend It's a City a followup film to Public Speaking, also a Scorsese film starring Lebowitz. According to Lebowitz, the title is a line she'd shout at people when trying to get them to move from the middle of a packed sidewalk. After the COVID-19 pandemic started, she noted, "now people think it has some more lyrical, metaphorical meaning." The chapters are loosely organized around topics like money, athletics, transportation, and others.

The documentary was shot before the pandemic. Filming took place in Manhattan, although Lebowitz said, "we did go to Queens, [and it was] something Marty talked about as if we were going to Afghanistan." Other locations include the Players Club, the New York Public Library and the streets of Manhattan.

The documentary was dedicated to Lebowitz's longtime friend Toni Morrison. In January 2021, Saturday Night Live spoofed the series, with Bowen Yang as Lebowitz and Kyle Mooney as Scorsese.

== Cast ==
=== Main ===
- Fran Lebowitz as herself
- Martin Scorsese as himself

=== Recurring ===
- Alec Baldwin as himself
- Spike Lee as himself
- David Letterman as himself
- Toni Morrison as herself
- Olivia Wilde as herself

== Episodes ==
No.	Title	Directed by	Original release date
1	"Pretend It's a City"	Martin Scorsese	January 8, 2021
2	"Cultural Affairs"	Martin Scorsese	January 8, 2021
3	"Metropolitan Transit"	Martin Scorsese	January 8, 2021
4	"Board of Estimate"	Martin Scorsese	January 8, 2021
5	"Department of Sports & Health"	Martin Scorsese	January 8, 2021
6	"Hall of Records"	Martin Scorsese	January 8, 2021
7	"Library Services"	Martin Scorsese	January 8, 2021

== Critical reception ==
On Rotten Tomatoes, the series holds an approval rating of 90% based on 30 reviews, with an average rating of 7.83/10. The website's critical consensus reads, "If Pretend It's a City can't quite live up to its central duo's creative clout, it's still a delight to see their love for their city—and one another—in full bloom." On Metacritic, the series has a weighted average score of 76 out of 100, based on 11 critics, indicating "generally favorable reviews".

The New Yorker in January 2021 said the documentary's depiction of pre-pandemic New York "feels like a balm in a wildly shifting world." CNN described the series as a Scorsese "vanity project," but did say the show "certainly yields its share of amusing thoughts and wry observations, many of which are worth recording for posterity." RogerEbert.com gave it 3.5 stars, writing "Fran Lebowitz's delivery is masterful. So, if the first episode hooks you, this is worth binge-watching." The Guardian called it a "pitch-perfect dream of Warholian parties and drinking with friends, soundtracked by Lebowitz's epigrams, which stack up like the hot dog buns of the Manhattan vendor she passes." PopMatters says the series "is about three and a half hours long, by far the biggest dose we've ever had of Lebowitz in one go. The runtime is relentless and the speaker is relentless and the strangers crawling all over New York are relentless and the audience's lust for more minutes is relentless." The Sydney Morning Herald called it "the most fun you can have on Netflix right now." Vogue called the documentary "one of the best things you will watch this year."
