= Duncan Phyfe =

American cabinetmaker (1768–1854)

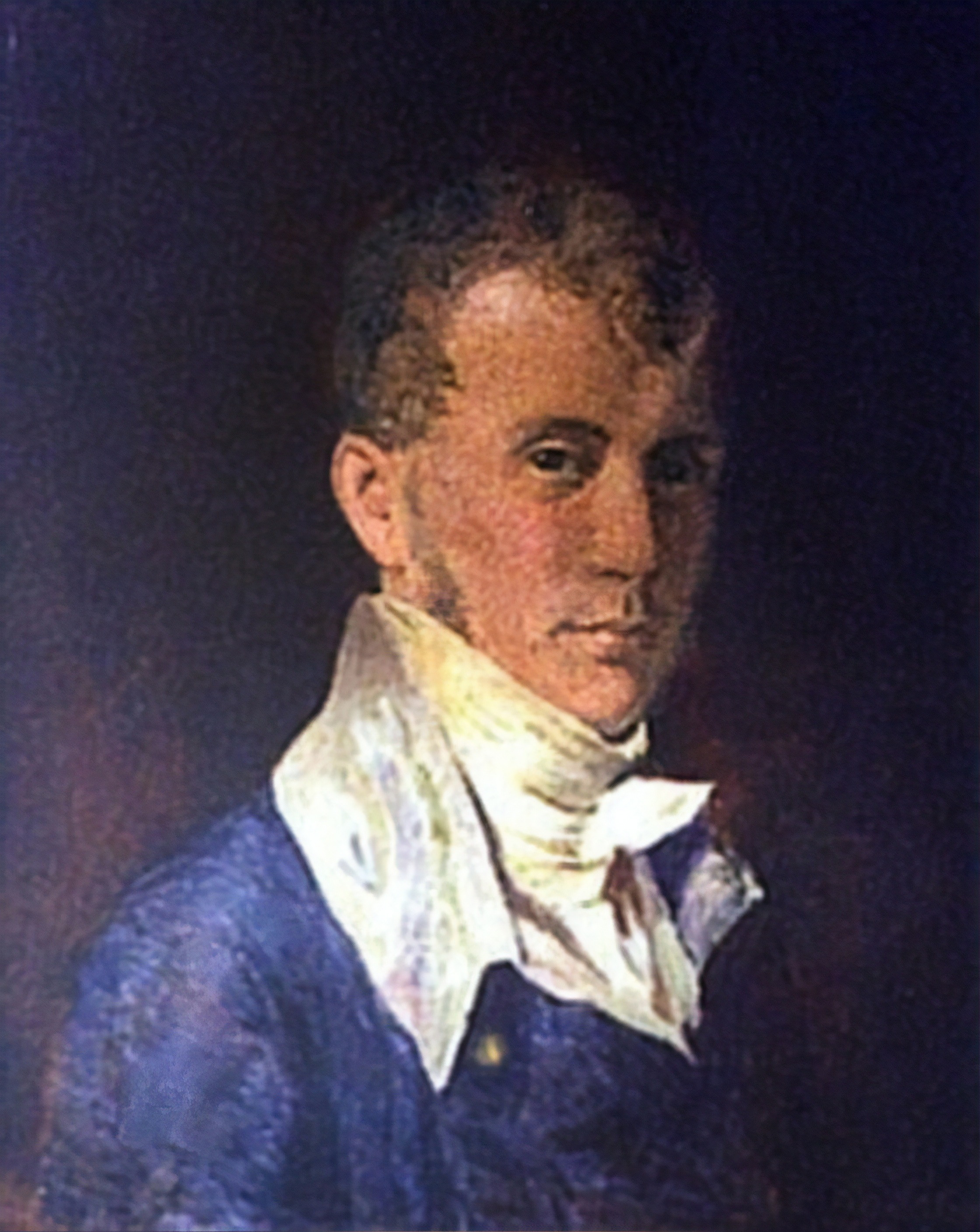
- Born: Duncan Fife; 1768; Abernethy and Kincardine, Scotland
- Died: 16 August 1854; New York City, United States
- Occupations: Cabinetmaker, businessman
- Years active: 1792–1847 (55 years as an independent cabinetmaker)
- Spouse: Rachel Louzada (ca. 1781–1851)
- Children: Michael (1794–1836) Mary (1795–1870) William (1799–ca. 1802) Eliza (1801–1890) William (1803–1875) Edward (1808–1887) James (presumably dead by 1814) Isabella (ca. 1814–1841) James Duncan (1814–1887)

Duncan Phyfe (1768 – 16 August 1854) was one of nineteenth-century America's leading cabinetmakers.

Rather than create a new furniture style, he interpreted fashionable European trends in a manner so distinguished and particular that he became a major spokesman for Neoclassicism in the United States, influencing a generation of American cabinetmakers.

== Life and career ==
Born Duncan Fife near Loch Fannich, Scotland, he immigrated with his family to Albany, New York, in 1784 and served as a cabinetmaker’s apprentice.

In 1791 he moved to New York City and one year later is documented the earliest mention of him in the city, when he was elected to the General Society of Mechanics and Tradesmen, sponsored by Isaac Nichols and Seabury Champlin, either of whom may have trained him.

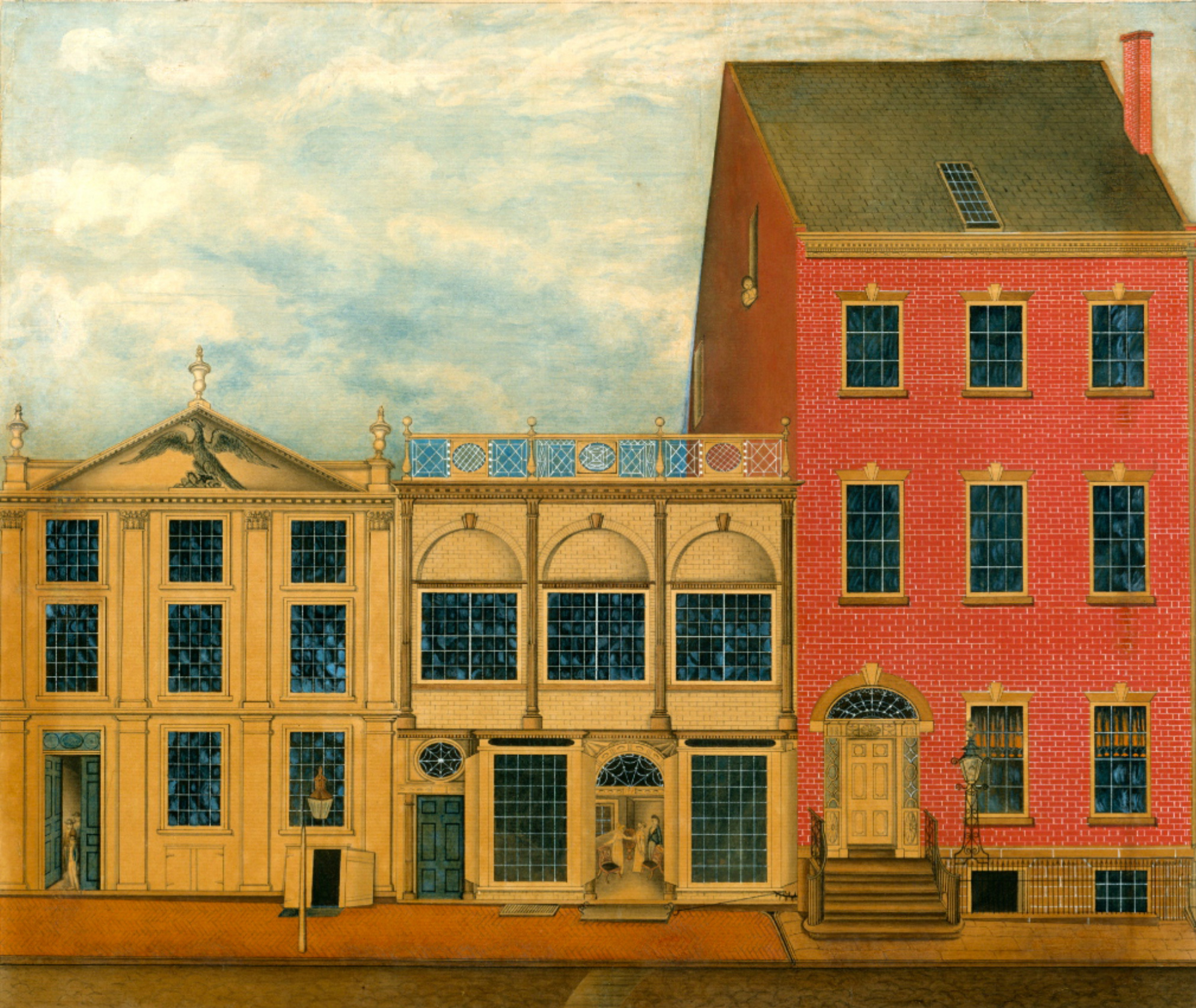
Shop and warehouse on 168–172 Fulton Street, New York city.

By the time of his marriage in 1793, he appears in the New York directories as a "joiner," but by 1794 he called himself "cabinetmaker" and had changed the spelling of his name to Phyfe. He opened his own business in 1794 and was listed as a cabinetmaker in the New-York Directory and Register. From his first shop on 2 Broad Street, he later moved to Partition Street (later renamed Fulton Street in 1817 in honor of Robert Fulton), where he stayed for the rest of his life.

A poor immigrant when he arrived in America from his native Scotland, Phyfe acquired wealth and fame through hard work, exceptional talent and the support of patrons. He would come to count among his clients some of the nation's wealthiest and most storied families. Throughout the first half of the nineteenth century he made Neoclassical furniture for the social and mercantile elite of New York, Philadelphia, Pennsylvania, and the American South where he was particularly popular. Known during his lifetime as the "United States Rage", to this day remains America's best-known cabinetmaker, establishing his reputation as a purveyor of luxury by designing high-quality furniture.

His personal style, characterized by superior proportions, balance, symmetry, and restraint, became the New York local style. Many apprentices and journeymen exposed to this distinctive style by serving a stint in the Phyfe shop or by copying the master cabinetmaker's designs helped to create and sustain this local school of cabinetmaking. Demand for Phyfe's work reached its peak between 1805 and 1820, although he remained a dominant figure in the trade until 1847, when he retired at the age of seventy-seven. Within the short span of a single generation, however, the work of the master was all but forgotten until the revival in the 1920s, when different furniture companies replicated his designs for several decades.

He became known as one of America's leading cabinetmakers by selling furniture at relatively low prices. Phyfe’s work encompassed a broad range of the period’s Neoclassical styles, starting from his earliest furniture— which bear the influence of his 18th-century British predecessors Thomas Sheraton and Thomas Hope— continuing with Regency, Federal, Empire and ending with his late simplified designs in the Grecian plain style.

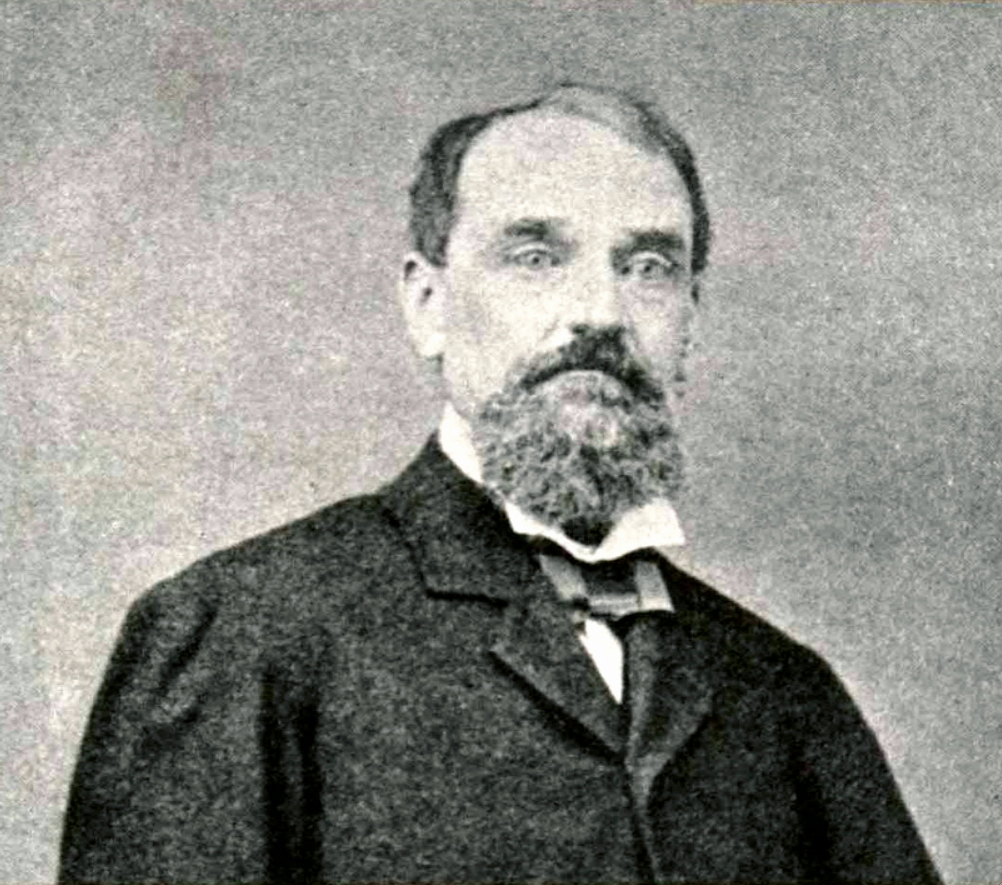
James Duncan Phyfe

Between 1837 and 1847, Duncan Phyfe took his two sons, Michael and James, as business partners and the firm went under the names D. Phyfe & Sons (1837–1840) and after Michael's premature death, D. Phyfe & Son (1840–1847). It was during the latter and final stages of the business’s history that perhaps the greatest challenge Phyfe ever faced emerged; how to cope with the new wave of historical revival styles. In 1840, one Southern planter who came to New York from Columbia, South Carolina, observed to his wife in a letter that the Phyfes were "as much behind the times in style as (they were) in price." Because the Phyfes always adhered to the classicist language, they never fully engaged with the emerging historical revival styles (e.g. Gothic, Rococo, Renaissance etc.) that began about this time.

Duncan Phyfe and his son James closed the family business in 1847 after fifty-five years in the trade. They held an auction of the remaining contents of their furniture warehouse. The auctioneer was Halliday & Jenkins.

Because Phyfe's furniture was seldom signed, yet widely imitated, it is sometimes difficult to determine with accuracy which works he actually made. He is interred at Green-Wood Cemetery in Brooklyn, New York.

== Major exhibitions and collections ==
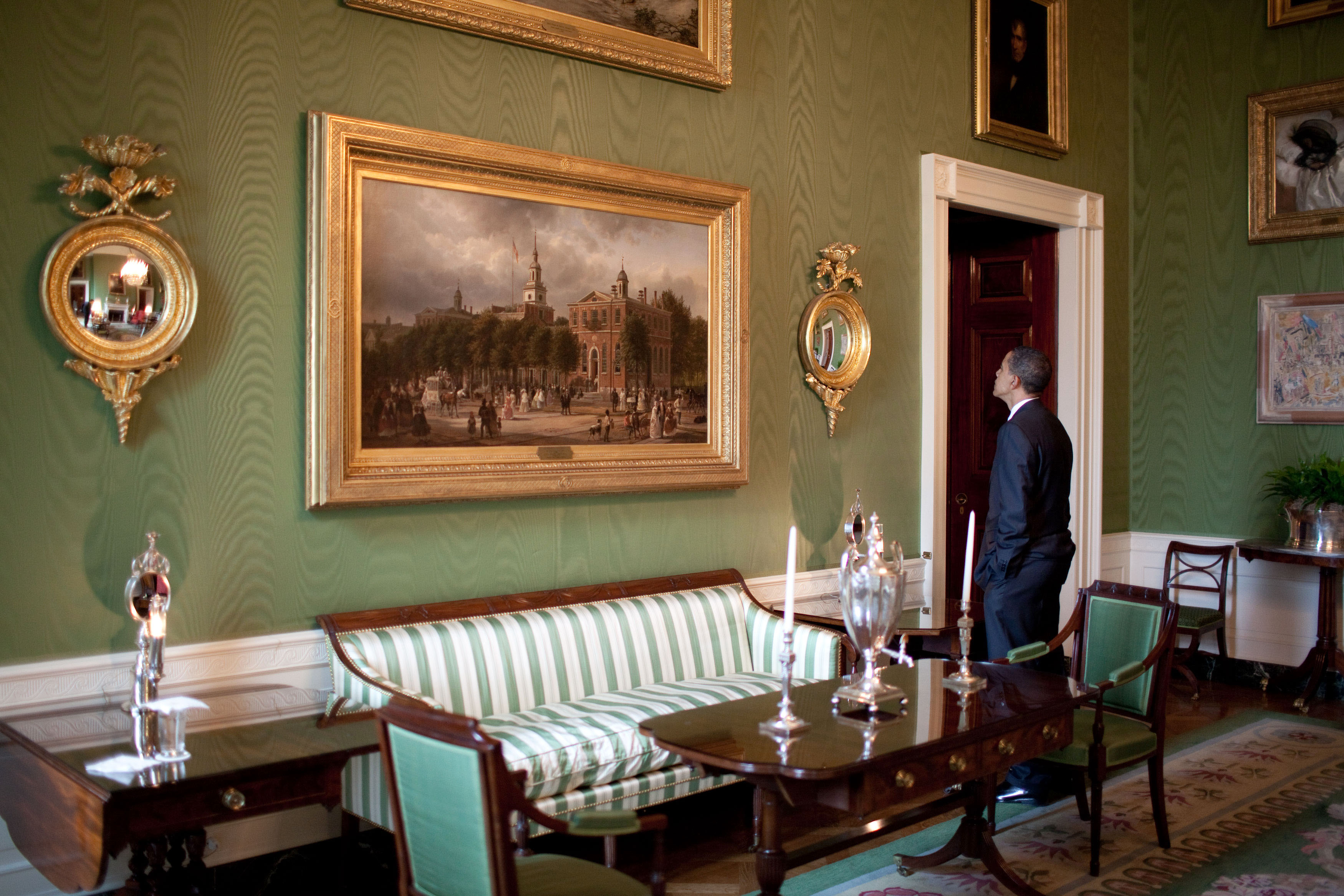
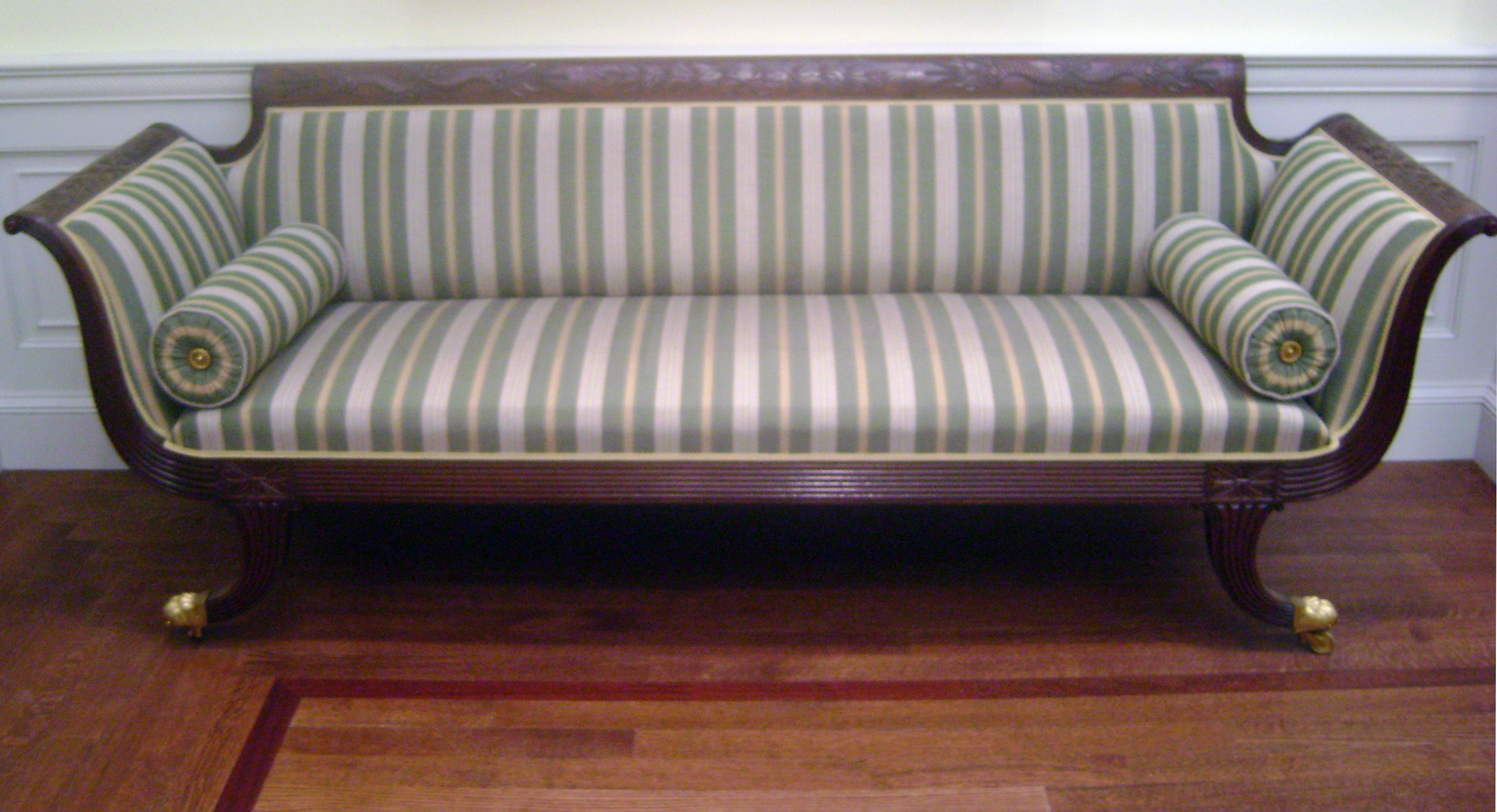
Left: Barack Obama in the Green Room next to a striped D. Phyfe sofa. Right: Another sofa, ca. 1810–1815. Attributed to the workshop of Duncan Phyfe. Mahogany, cherry, pine, gilt brass, and modern upholstery. On loan to the Cincinnati Art Museum.

On 15 October 1922, the Metropolitan Museum of Art opened to the public "Furniture from the Workshop of Duncan Phyfe", the first exhibition ever held in an art museum on the work of a single cabinetmaker. Ninety years later and only for the second time in history, a major retrospective on this iconic American craftsman and his furniture was again on view from 20 December 2011 – 6 May 2012, under the title "Duncan Phyfe: Master Cabinetmaker in New York".

Another exhibition took place at the Museum of Fine Arts, Houston from 24 June – 9 September 2012.

Duncan Phyfe's furniture can be admired in the White House Green Room, Boscobel House and Gardens, Edgewater, Roper House and especially at Millford Plantation, owned by the Classical American Homes Preservation Trust. His furniture appears in many museums and private collections as well.

== In popular culture ==
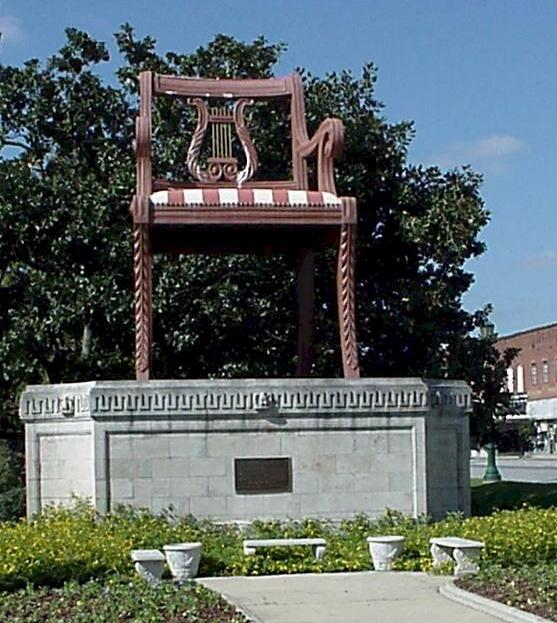
Giant Duncan Phyfe chair in Thomasville, North Carolina, erected 1950

Phyfe’s artistry has continued to resonate with collectors and creative communities throughout the 20th and 21st centuries. This can be seen through popular culture references to his craftsmanship, the high esteem in which it is held, and the cultural cachet it confers. Examples of such references include the following:

Karl Shapiro refers to the fly's leg as "the fine leg of a Duncan-Phyfe," in his poem "The Fly".

Likewise, in one of the passages of the novel Tender is the Night by F. Scott Fitzgerald, he wrote: "She wept all over a set that cost a fortune, in a Duncan Phyfe dining-room...".

Similarly, in her novel Jazz, Toni Morrison refers to Phyfe: “after they’d eaten they rolled cigarettes and settled down on the curb as though it were a Duncan Phyfe.”

In the Summer episode of Gilmore Girls: A Year in the Life, Rory notes that Emily's living room table is a Duncan Phyfe.

In the episode A Plaque for Mayberry on The Andy Griffith Show, the character Barney Fife thinks he is related to Duncan Phyfe.

in the episode Slow Dance (season 2, episode 7) on Northern Exposure, Maurice explains that a chaise lounge he owns is a Duncan Phyfe.

Fran Lebowitz references his artistry as a fine companion for anyone in her piece “Pointers for Pets” from her collection Social Studies (1981): “Georgian silver and Duncan Phyfe sofas make wonderful companions, as do all alcoholic beverages and out-of-season fruits.”

One of the world's largest roadside attractions is a giant chair located in Thomasville, North Carolina. The monument was erected in 1950, and the plaque located on its pedestal reads: "This chair is an exemplar and inspiration for future generations to emulate and perpetuate the achievements of our time-honored furniture designers and craftsmen. ... The original chair was the creation of the famous American designer Duncan Phyfe".

Some years later, another replica of a Phyfe model chair was built in 1959 in Washington, DC.

== See also ==
- Charles-Honoré Lannuier, another reputable cabinetmaker
