= Jaafar Abbas =

Sudanese writer and journalist

Jaafar Abbas is a Sudanese writer and journalist, famous for his satirical style (List of satirists and satires). Born in Khartoum, he graduated at the University of Khartoum, receiving a Bachelor of Arts degree in English. In 1977, he was "certified" as a TV producer by the British Council Media Institute in London.

== Career ==
He has worked in a variety of positions in newspapers of Persian Gulf countries newspapers and in BBC Arabic section. He is currently working as the director of quality assurance department in Al Jazeera.

== Publications ==
In 1994, his book obtuse angles was released. He also released another book in 2008 called Obtuse angles and other Acute ones. In October 2012, he published The Biography of a homeland in the March of a Citizen?.
