= Alicia D'Anvers =

English poet

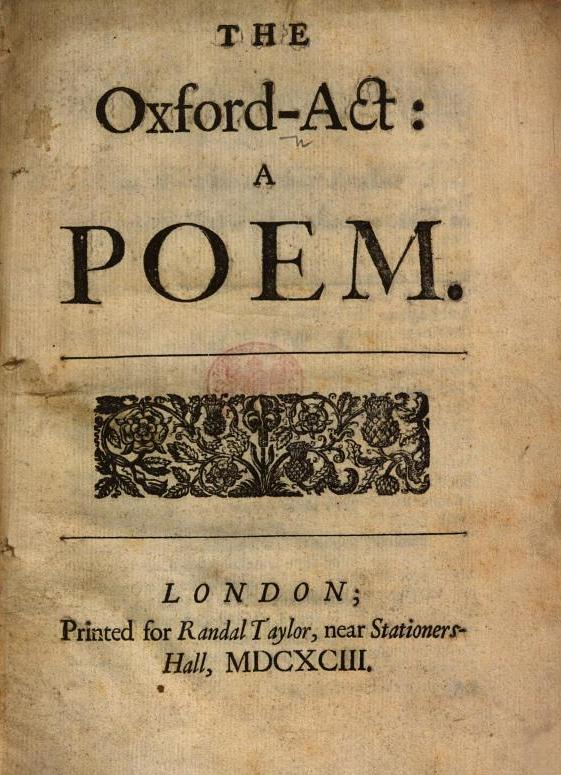
- Title page, Alicia D'Anvers, The Oxford Act (1693) (Google Books)
- Born: Alicia Clarke; 1668; Oxford
- Died: 1725 (aged 56–57)
- Resting place: Holywell, Oxford
- Occupation: writer
- Spouse: Knightley D'Anvers
- Relatives: Samuel Clarke (father)
- Writing career
- Language: English
- Notable works: Academia, or, The Humours of the University of Oxford

Alicia D'Anvers [née Clarke] (baptised 1668–1725) was an English poet known for her satires of academic life.

== Biography ==
Born in Oxford, her father, Samuel Clarke (bap. 1624, d. 1669), was superior beadle of civil law and first architypographus, or director of printing, for the University of Oxford. He died when she was two. She married barrister Knightley D'Anvers (c.1670–1740), son of Jane Knightly and physician Daniel D'Anvers, in 1688. D'Anvers had no children.

D'Anvers is known to have published two poems with a third generally attributed to her. A Poem Upon His Sacred Majesty, His Voyage For Holland: By way of Dialogue, Between Belgia and Britannia (1691) was dedicated to Queen Mary; it is a poetic dialogue between Britannia and Belgia which addresses criticisms that King William III had divided loyalties between the Netherlands, the country of his birth, and Britain. According to Germaine Greer et al., it is "as dull as might be expected," but another commentator calls it politically "daring." The second and third poems — Academia, or, The Humours of the University of Oxford. In Burlesque Verse (1691) and The Oxford-Act: a Poem (1693) — satirise elements of academic life at the University of Oxford. These latter were part of a long tradition of university satire not usually practiced by women. D'Anvers would seem to have been quite familiar with college politics, and both poems target the alleged sexual activities of Oxford students. The Oxford-Act is particularly bawdy, which may explain why it was published anonymously. Academia, or, The Humours of the University of Oxford was D'Anvers' most popular poem; told from the perspective of a town servant, it lampoons the current state of the university through the eyes of a visiting country bumpkin, one John Blunder, and consists of 1,411 lines of "robust colloquial iambic tetrameters, called hudibrastics."

One modern commentator has described D'Anvers as "that splendid Oxford satirist" though another characterizes Academia as "ribald, scurrilous doggerel." Her work has been anthologized in Kissing the Rod (1988), and Early Modern Women Poets.

== Works ==
- A Poem Upon His Sacred Majesty, His Voyage For Holland: By way of Dialogue, Between Belgia and Britannia. London, Printed for Tho. Bever, at the Hand and Star, near Temple Barr, in Fleet-street, 1691.
- Academia, or, The Humours of the University of Oxford. In Burlesque Verse. London: Randal Taylor. 1691.
- The Oxford-Act: a Poem. London: Printed for Randal Taylor, 1693.

== See also ==
- Campus novel
- List of satirists and satires
