= Ron Ferri =

American contemporary artist (1932–2019)

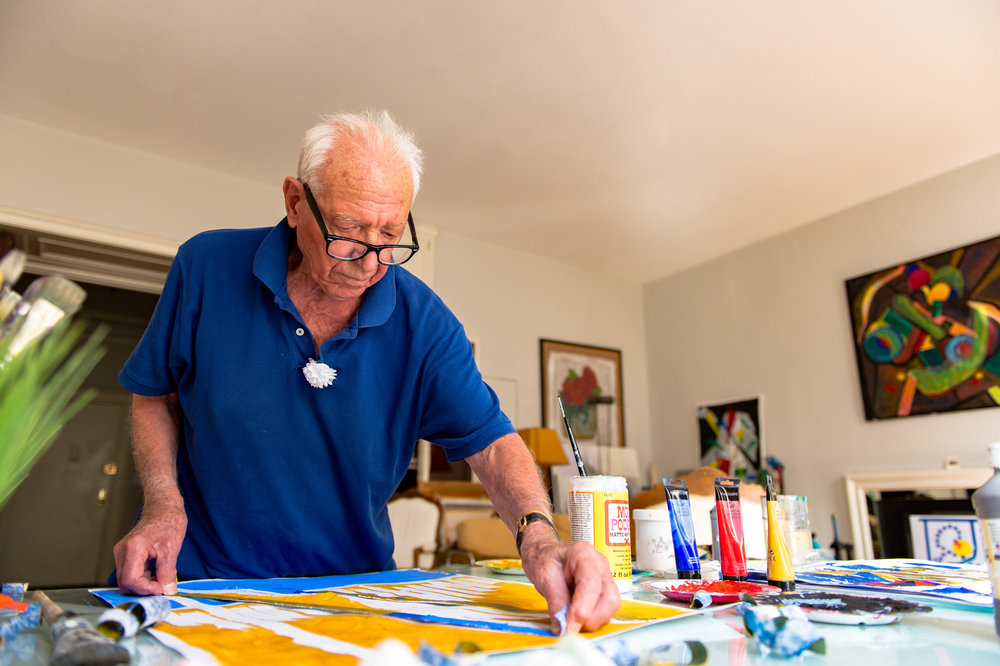
- Photograph by RobertBanat.com
- Born: Ronaldo Ferri; August 19, 1932; Rhode Island, US
- Died: June 13, 2019 (aged 86); Cote D'Azur, France
- Education: Rochester Institute of Technology
- Occupation: Artist

Ron Ferri (August 19, 1932 – June 13, 2019) was an American contemporary artist. He was a multi-media artist employing materials in both traditional and non-traditional ways, like oil on canvas, ink on paper, collage, with later works exploring the digital realm. He was most known for his neon works from the 60s and 70s.

== Biography ==
Born in 1932, Ferri began his career as a professional ice skater, which was cut short when he was called to service in the United States Air Force where he served for five years as a flight navigator with tours in Africa, England, Italy, and Spain. After completing his service, he attended the Rhode Island School of Design, the Rochester Institute of Technology, New York University, and studied under Hans Hofmann at the Academie des Beaux Arts, Paris.

Beginning in the late 1960s, Ferri began working with materials like neon and plexiglass to create unique works of art and design as well as large scale installations. The neon artworks were widely coveted and his work found an eager audience throughout the 1970s and 80s. In the decades to come, his work continued to evolve and was readily exhibited and collected worldwide.

== Art and legacy ==
A close friend of Andy Warhol's, Ferri gained fame and prestige in the 1970s. At that time, neon was the predominant material in his original and unpredictable works. In 1983 he chose to change registration, spurred by a visit he made to Japan. "I was traveling with Hubert de Givenchy and Audrey Hepburn, and designer Issey Miyake invited us to a sumo fight. I was fascinated by the aesthetics of the wrestlers, so huge and with the skin so white that they looked like living porcelain sculptures." Ferri remained in the East for a time, painting a series of paintings with sumo as inspiration.

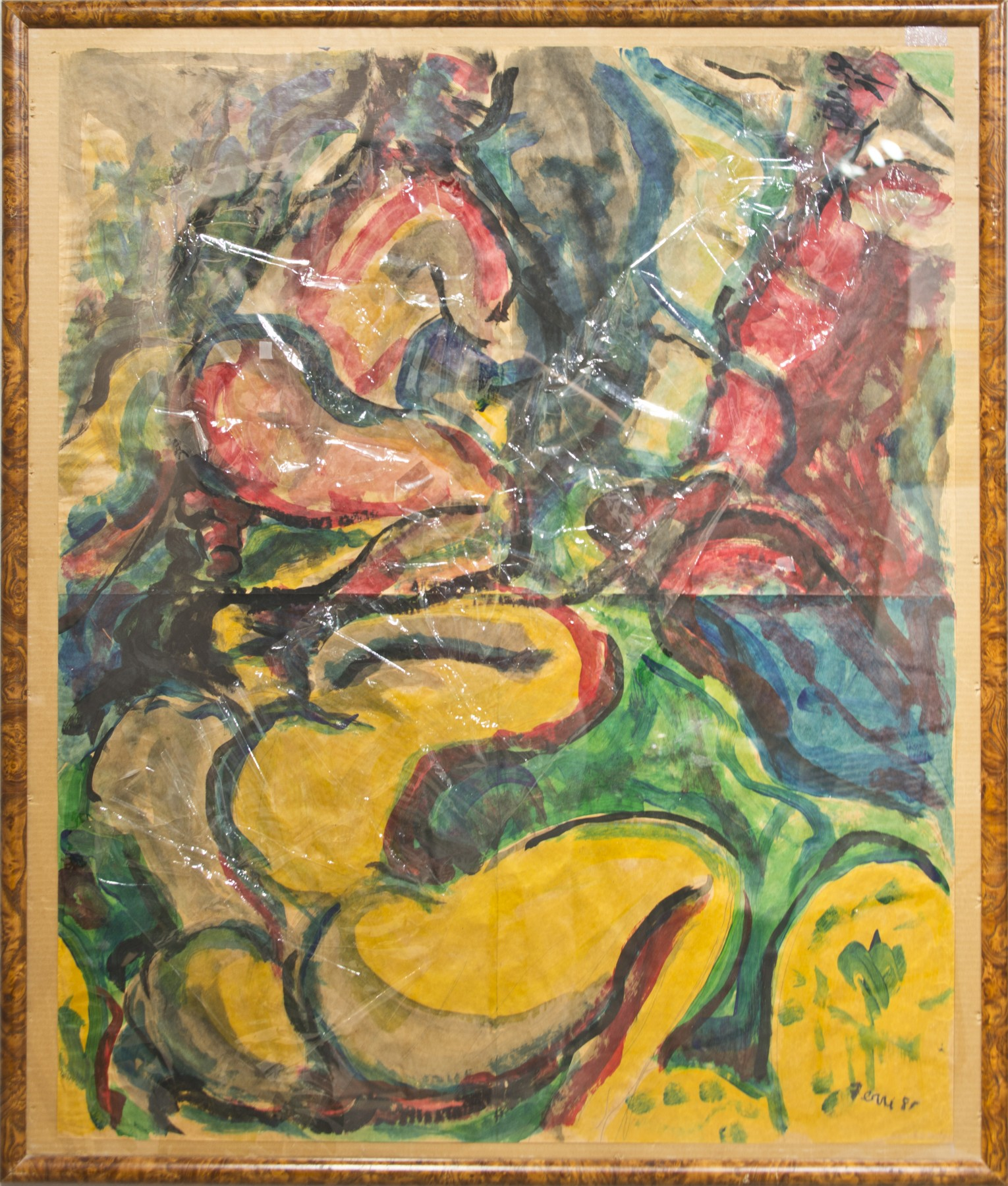

In 2006, Ferri was commissioned for a worldwide Rolex and Tudor campaign where his art was displayed across buildings, serving as canvases, in select capital cities around the world.

Ferri's work is in the collections of the Museum of Modern Art (MOMA, New York), the Smithsonian American Museum (Washington, DC), the Art Institute of Chicago, the Philadelphia Museum of Art, the Whitney Museum of American Art, the National Gallery of Art (Washington, DC), and the Musée d' Art Moderne (Saint-Etienne, France).

Ron's art drew many prominent collectors to his work including the likes of Elsa Perretti, Jane Holzer, Egon Von Furstenberg, Pilar Crespi, Steve Rubell, Ian Schrager, Arnold Scassi, Elsa Martinelli, Jacqueline Stone, Oliver Stone, Carly Simon, Eileen & Jerry Ford, Asher Edelman, Elie de Rothschild, Pierre Schlumberger, Barbara Allen Kwiatkowski, Francois Catroux, Alberto Pinto, Valentino Garavani, Mr. & Mrs. Goulandris, Hubert Givenchy, Elle Macpherson and Jack Nicholson.

== Studio 54 and Neon Art ==
In the 60s, Ron became interested in incorporating neon lighting into his work and was famous for his neon sculptures which were, and still are, widely coveted. During this time, Ron was one of the early pioneers of disco, incorporating neon lighting into his nightlife projects. Ron Ferri was a friend of Ian Schrager and Steve Rubbell, and played a large part in introducing them to the New York social set, such as the designer Halston and PR impresario Carmen D'Alessio, which led to the phenomenon of Studio 54.

== Death ==
Ferri died on June 13, 2019, in the Côte d'Azur at the age of 86.
