= Mr. Chas and Lisa Sue Meet the Pandas =

1994 children's book by Fran Lebowitz

- First edition
- Author: Fran Lebowitz (writer); Michael Graves (illustrator)
- Language: English
- Genre: Children's literature
- Publisher: Alfred A. Knopf
- Publication date: 1994
- Publication place: United States
- Media type: Print
- ISBN: 978-0-679-86052-5

Mr. Chas and Lisa Sue Meet the Pandas is a 1994 children's book written by Fran Lebowitz with illustrations by Michael Graves.

== Overview ==
The book tells a story of two children who meet two intelligent giant pandas living a secret life in their New York apartment building. Only able to go out in public disguised as dogs, they long to move to Paris where dogs are welcome in restaurants and museums.
