= Social Studies (book) =

1981 essay collection by Fran Lebowitz

- First edition cover
- Author: Fran Lebowitz
- Language: English
- Genre: Essays
- Publisher: Random House
- Publication date: 1981
- Publication place: United States
- Media type: Print (hardcover and paperback)
- Pages: 147
- ISBN: 0394512456

Social Studies is a 1981 collection of comedic essays by American writer Fran Lebowitz.

To mark publication of Social Studies, Fran Lebowitz was interviewed in September 1981 by filmmaker John Waters about the collection, her stance on modern urbanity, and the life of a writer, published in the magazine Interview. The long-form, wide-ranging, and humorous exchange was republished online in March 2023.

Social Studies later was re-released in a 1994 compilation titled The Fran Lebowitz Reader along with Lebowitz's 1978 essay collection Metropolitan Life.

In her signature fashion, Lebowitz records her wry observations, tastes, preferences, and aesthetic values within the essays of this second collection of her stories and opinion pieces. One of the essays in Social Studies, for example, “Pointers for Pets”, recommends 19th-century American cabinetmaker Duncan Phyfe’s artistry, remarking: “Georgian silver and Duncan Phyfe sofas make wonderful companions, as do all alcoholic beverages and out-of-season fruits.” (p. 55)
