= Régine Zylberberg =

Belgian-French singer and nightclub impresaria (1929–2022)

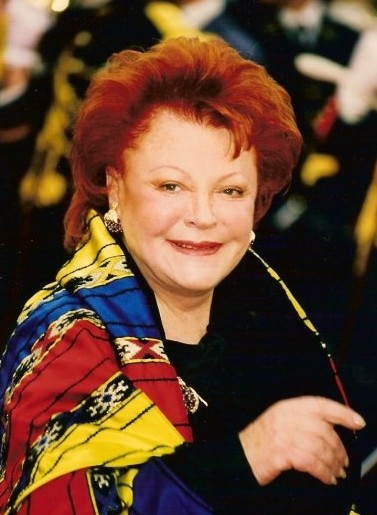
- Zylberberg at the 1997 Cannes Film Festival
- Born: Régina Zylberberg; 26 December 1929; Anderlecht, Belgium
- Died: 1 May 2022 (aged 92); 17th arrondissement of Paris, France
- Other name: Régine
- Occupations: Nightclub impresario; singer; actress
- Years active: 1956–2016
- Spouses: Leon Rothcage (m. 1947; div. 1949) Roger Choukroun (m. 1969; div. 2004)
- Children: 1

Régine Zylberberg (born Régina Zylberberg; 26 December 1929 – 1 May 2022), often known mononymously as Régine (French pronunciation: [ʁeʒin]), was a Belgian-born French singer, actress, nightclub impresario, and businesswoman.

Rising to prominence in the 1950s and 1960s, she built an international nightlife empire with her chain of Régine’s clubs, which became synonymous with celebrity culture, luxury, and the emerging jet set. Often called the "Queen of the Night," Regine is credited with pioneering the modern discotheque while maintaining a parallel career as a recording artist and entertainer.

== Biography ==
Régina Zylberberg was born in Anderlecht, Belgium, to Polish Jewish parents, Joseph Zylberberg and Tauba Rodstein. She spent much of her early life in hiding from the Nazis in occupied wartime France. Abandoned in infancy by her unwed mother who moved to Argentina, she was 12 when her father was arrested by the Nazis. She hid in a convent, where she was reportedly beaten. After the war, she sold bras in the streets of Paris. Her father, Joseph, managed to survive the war. He opened a cafe in Paris's Belleville neighborhood.

Zylberberg had one son, Lionel, from her first husband Leon Rothcage, whom she married when she was 17 and divorced two years later.

Known as Régine, she became a torch singer; by 1953, she was a nightclub manager in Paris. She is attributed with the invention of the modern-day discothèque, by virtue of creating a new dynamic atmosphere at Paris' Whisky à Gogo, with the ubiquitous jukebox replaced by disc jockeys utilizing linked turntables. Zylberberg's Paris Whisky à Gogo became the inspiration for the later establishment of the Whisky a Go Go nightclub in Los Angeles.

In 1958, she opened Chez Régine in the Latin Quarter of Paris, which became the place to be seen for visiting celebrities, socialites and royalty.

After performing at Paris's famed Olympia in the 1960s, Régine went on to perform at Carnegie Hall in New York.

As Zylberberg's celebrity expanded she established nightclubs under her name in major cities such as New York, London and Monte Carlo. These were ultra-selective venues in prime urban locations, all featuring her signature "disco-style" layout. At the height of her popularity, her nightlife empire had 22 venues.

In 1974, Zylberberg established Jimmy'z nightclub in Monaco.

In 1975, Zylberberg was accompanied by her second husband, Roger Choukroun, to New York. They split their time living between Paris and a penthouse suite at the Delmonico Hotel on Park Avenue and 59th Street in New York. In 1976, she opened Regine's nightclub on the ground floor of the hotel. The nightclub served food under the direction of French chef Michel Guérard. The following year, she opened a bistro alongside the nightclub called Cafe Reginette.

In 1978, Zylberberg opened a Regine's in the Hyatt Regency Hotel in Montreal.

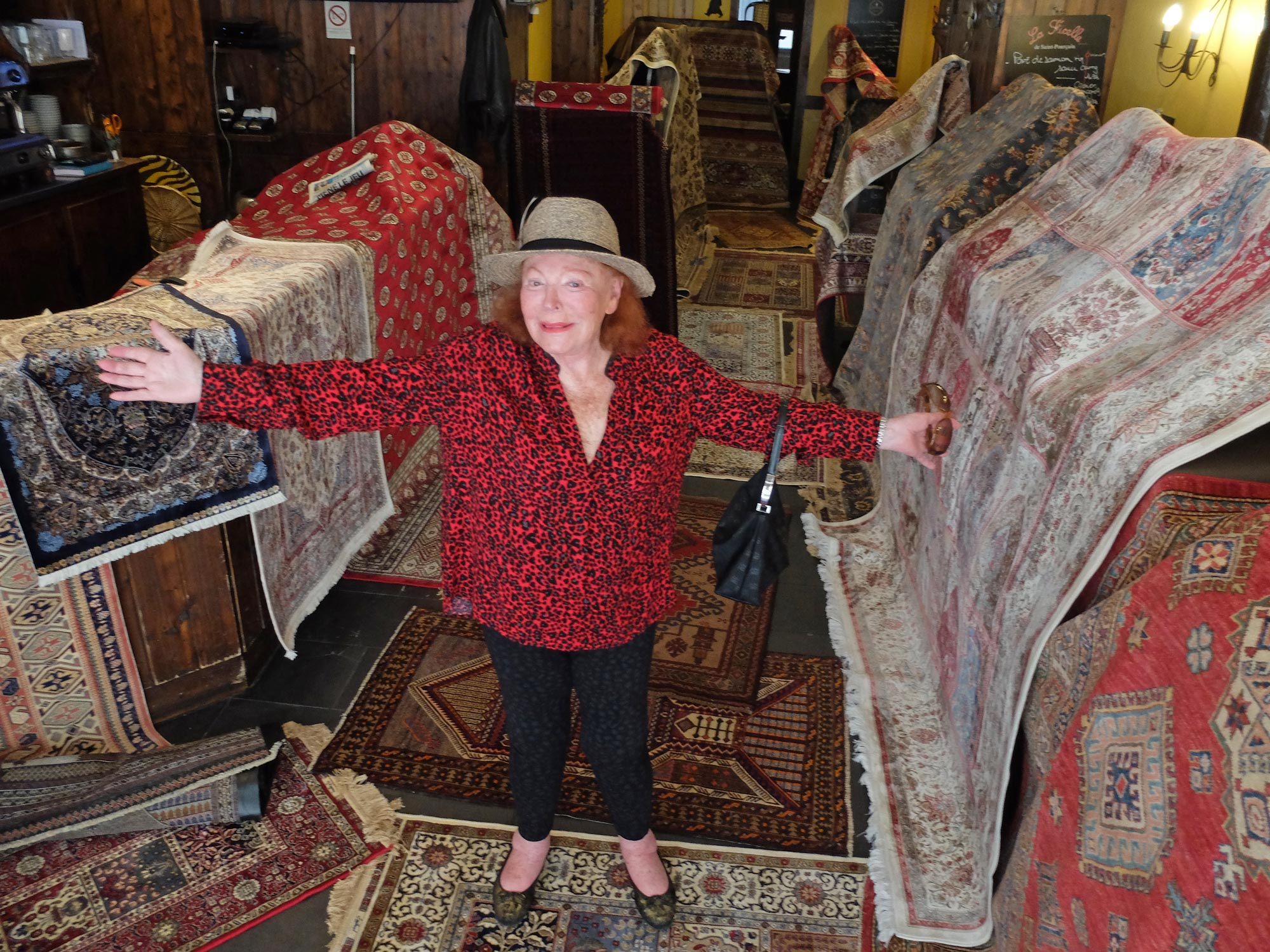
Régine in 2019

In the 1970s, Zylberberg also designed a line of "Ready-to-Dance" evening clothes that were proof against wrinkling and so could be packed, which were sold at Bloomingdale's.

In 1988, she was in charge of the Ledoyen Restaurant on the Champs-Élysées in Paris.

On 22 April 1996, Zylberberg and her son were arrested for refusing to comply with crew requests and smoking on an American Airlines flight. It was alleged that, though she was traveling economy, Régine had demanded a first-class upgrade, which the airline declined.

In June 2011, she appeared as Solange in Follies at the Kennedy Center in Washington, D.C.

She lived with her husband in Saint-Tropez. They divorced in 2004.

Zylberberg died at the age of 92 in Paris on 1 May 2022. Her funeral took place on 9 May at the Père-Lachaise Cemetery crematorium. In attendance were celebrities such as Jane Birkin, Carla Bruni, Marc Lavoine, Carole Bouquet, and Anne Hidalgo.

== Discography ==
=== Albums ===
- 1967: Régine (Pathé)
- 1968: 1969 (Pathé)
- 1970: La Fille Que Je Suis (Pathé)
- 1971: Régine (Pathé)
- 1973: Regine (CBS)
- 1978: Jackpot (CBS)
- 1984: Regine (Trema)
- 1993: Mémo Mélo (Trema)
- 2003: Made In Paname (Warner Jazz France)
- 2009: Régine's Duets (AZ)

== Filmography ==
- 1962:The Dance (La gamberge)
- 1968: Marry Me! Marry Me! (Mazel Tov ou le Mariage )
- 1970: Emergency Exit (Sortie de secours)
- 1973: The Train (Le Train)
- 1976: Sherlock Holmes Attacks the Orient Express
- 1978: Robert et Robert
- 1984: My New Partner (Les Ripoux)
- 1994: Dead Tired (Grosse Fatigue)
