= The Second Supper =

Web newspaper

The Second Supper was a website and newspaper published in La Crosse, Wisconsin. The newspaper was published weekly from its headquarters in downtown La Crosse.

Initially created as a satirical newspaper, The Second Supper has since 2007 become more focused on local interest stories. Weekly issues include music, new films, cult classics, and book reviews, as well as Q&As with established and up-and-coming musicians such as Hanson, Wes Borland, Killdozer, Julien-K, and Freezepop. Local interest stories and editorial columns take up the leading share of content, often sticking to a universal theme for the week's issue.

The Second Supper has had its share of controversy. In 2006, the paper published a satirical piece about former United States Vice President Dick Cheney. For the 2007 Oktoberfest issue, the paper's cover featured a gloved hand emerging from water, about La Crosse's history of river drownings.
