= James Beresford (writer) =

- Born: 28 May 1764
- Died: 29 November 1840 (aged 76)
- Occupations: writer, clergyman
- Notable work: The Miseries of Human Life (1806–07)

James Beresford (28 May 1764 – 29 September 1840) was a writer and clergyman. He was born in Upham in Hampshire and educated at Charterhouse School and became a fellow of Merton College, Oxford. He made translations and wrote religious books, but was chiefly known as the author of a satirical work, The Miseries of Human Life, considered to be a "minor classic in the genre". Beresford also wrote under the pseudonyms An Aspirant, Ignato Secudno, Samuel Sensitive and Timothy Testy. He was rector of Kibworth from 1812 until his death.

== Bibliography ==
This list of works is taken from Beresford's obituary, published in the May 1841 edition of The Gentleman's Magazine.

- The Æneid of Virgil (1794)
- The Song of the Sun (1805)
- The Battle of Trafalgar (1805)
- The Miseries of Human Life (1806)
- A Discourse on Cruelty to the Brute Creation (1809)
- Bibliosophia, or Book-Wisdom (1810)
- A Thanksgiving Sermon (1814)
- Does Faith Insure Good Works? (1814)
- A Letter to Philo, in Answer to his Objections Against an Essay on Faith and Works (1815)
- An Examination of the Doctrines of Calvin (1818)
- On the Objects and Services of the Society for Promoting Christian Knowledge and its Diocesan and District Committees (1819)
- The Cross and the Crescent, an Heroic Metrical Romance (1824)
- Stand! An Earnest Address to the Friends of an Embodied Church in England and Ireland (1835)
