= Huzlers =

American satirical blog

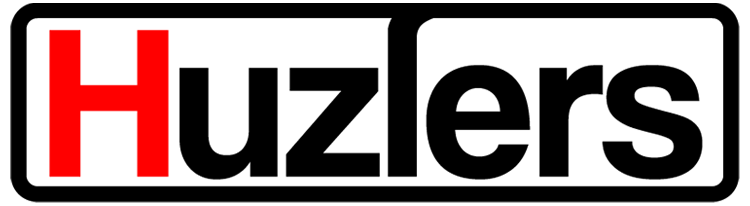
- Website type: Blog
- Owner: Pablo Reyes Jr.
- Editor: David Martinez
- Website: huzlers.com
- Commercial: Yes
- Launched: January 2014

Huzlers was a Chicago based satirical blog. A number of their satirical stories have been mentioned by many established press organizations such as USA Today and BuzzFeed.

According to Comscore, the site attracted about 387,000 unique visitors per month.

== Notable articles ==
=== "'Jake, From State Farm' — Murdered For Cheating?" ===
On October 26, 2015, the site published a satirical article claiming that Jake from the State Farm commercials caught cheating on his wife; in the article 'Jake From State Farm' was reportedly found dead in his apartment bedroom Saturday night. According to authorities, Jake was killed by his wife after finding him in bed with another woman. Inquisitr later published an article "Jake From State Farm Murdered By Wife After Being Caught Cheating".

=== "Man Arrested After Making Over $1 Million Selling Chuck E. Cheese Tokens As Bitcoins" ===
In December 2017, the site published an article claiming that a man scratched out the Chuck E. Cheese logo off tokens and drew in the Bitcoin logo before selling the coins on the street. The punishment for this fictional crime was a five-year prison sentence. The article was widely shared on social media.

=== "Employee Fired For Putting His Mixtape in Happy Meals" ===
On July 15, 2015, the site published a satirical article claiming that a McDonald's employee was fired for putting his mixtape inside children's Happy Meals. The article was shared over one million times and debunked as satire by Complex.

=== "Man Arrested After Showing Officer 'Finger Circle' When Asked For His License & Registration" ===
On January 1, 2018, the site published a joke news article which appeared to report that a man had been arrested in Chicago after he tried to get a police officer to play the "circle game" during a traffic stop. The article was soon debunked by Snopes.

=== "FDA Finds Thousands of Coors Light Beers Laced With Cocaine Nationwide" ===
On September 8, 2014, the site published a satirical article claiming the Food and Drug Administration had discovered "thousands" of contaminated Coors Light beers nationwide. U.S. News & World Report debunked the article after it went viral. "This story is not true," said FDA spokesman Peter Cassell." The claims continue to be shared via social media to this day.

== See also ==
- List of satirical magazines
- List of satirical news websites
