= The Fran Lebowitz Reader =

1994 essay collection by Fran Lebowitz

- First edition cover
- Author: Fran Lebowitz
- Language: English
- Genre: Essays
- Published: 1994 (Vintage Books, Random House)
- Publication place: United States
- Media type: Print
- Pages: 352

The Fran Lebowitz Reader is a 1994 collection of comedic essays by writer Fran Lebowitz.

The book compiles Lebowitz's two previous essay collections, Metropolitan Life (1978) and Social Studies (1981).
