= Craposyncrasies =

Satirical book by Sorush Pakzad

- Author: Sorush Pakzad
- Original title: Doozakhrafat دوزخرفات
- Language: Persian
- Genre: Satire
- Publisher: H&S Media
- Publication place: Iran
- English publication date: 2012
- Pages: 268
- ISBN: 978-1780831213

Craposyncrasies or Doozakhrafat is a book by Sorush Pakzad of satirical pieces in Persian, which were posted on his personal blog before publication. The book includes 107 stories about gods, prophets, and angels and was published in February 2012 by H&S Media. The publisher included the book among its top-sellers in 2014.

== Reception ==
Pakzad's critical approach towards the religious beliefs in the contemporary practices of Islam caught the attention of many critics. In his foreword to the book, Ebrahim Nabavi, one of the leading Iranian satirists, contends “I have never seen or heard of a book like Doozakhrafat… it is unique, pleasant, and deep.” In an article published in openDemocracy, Nabavi describes Doozakhrafat as "a unique magnum opus" for its "elegance, charm, and wonder" and praises the author as someone "who knows his job, has read much, is well-informed, and has studied theology and philosophy before fooling around with God." Nabavi encourages his readers to read the book before they die: “I have read many metaphysical and religious texts and I know the literature quite well. I have even tried to write along the path myself. But what Sorush Pakzad has done is way deeper… It has been a while since I have felt so inspired by reading a book. Elsewhere, Nabavi has described Sorush Pakzad as "an unparalleled talent in satire. His book, 'Doozakhrafat,' is full of original jokes with the universe, God, humans, the creation, heaven, and hell. This genre of satire [in Persian literature] has often lacked elegance and grace.".

Doozakhrafat, according to Massih Zekavat, the author of Satire, Humor and the Construction of Identities, “is subversive rather than revisionary.” “In its subversive recalcitrance,” Zekavat writes in his review of the book, “the persona at several instances sounds like a Byronic hero or a Nietzschean Übermensch... Instead of dispensing with metaphysics and replacing logic and empiricism, however, it only eliminates the positive side of metaphysical bipolarity and promotes the evil side in its existential and absurd, dark humour. The world of Craposyncrasies, in other words, features a pathetic and incompetent Deity and a dominant Evil force instead of the traditionally benevolent, wise and omnipotent God.”"

In an article published by Il Libraio, Doozakhrafat has been praised for its success in introducing a creative level of religious satire, without showing hostility in its language.

Mahmud Farjami, author, journalist, and researcher on Iranian comedy calls Doozakhrafat “an indisputable masterpiece in Persian parody.” Pakzad, Farjami believes, “is not only familiar with religious texts, fictions, and symbolism, but usually draws a parallel style to develop his story… It is difficult to find another book that contains so many original subjects that have been polished so masterfully.”

Yaser Mirdamadi, an Iranian scholar of analytic philosophy of religion and epistemology of Islam, in his interview about freedom of expression in ridiculing religion refers to Doozakhrafat as a book that satirizes religious beliefs without humiliation and insult:

“[The book] is a successful example of critical religious comedy that, although radical, is not humiliating or offensive. The critical aspect forces you to think while the comic aspect puts a smile on your face. The basis of all satirical pieces on religion in this book is to creatively emphasize this fact that the realm of gods, as depicted in religious practices, is humanly and affected by anthropomorphic perceptions of the divine… One might argue that this approach although morally justifiable, is religiously wrong. It seems that Sorush Pakzad’s critical satire is not only morally inoffensive but also insightful from a religious point of view.”

Roya Sadr, Iran's leading female satirist and researcher on Persian satire, in her review of the book, points out some of its literary qualities: “The forms are diverse, unbelievably diverse. The parodies are masterful; moreover, their innovative approach makes them more enjoyable. The writing is minimalistic and does not bore the reader with unnecessary information. Every detail is professionally and artistically designed in its correct position. Even the subtitles are obsessively and thoughtfully picked. Most of the stories enjoy a precise tone, a theatrical atmosphere, believable dialogues, and a surprise element."

“The form and language of the book,” she concludes, “confirms that the author knows what he is doing and has a well crafted view on the topic… All these qualities mixed with the author’s thorough knowledge of the wide range of subjects touched in the book make Doozakhrafat a rich and insightful piece.”

Using Doozakhrafat to open a discussion on the little touched topic of the relationship between satire and religion in Iran, Roya Sadr argues, “[the book] aims to challenge the masses’ superstitious perception of the divine in order to... show how anthropomorphic the images of God and the divine is in religious practices... Doozakhrafat enjoys a strong, deep, and penetrating perspective. I do not know the author, but Sorush Pakzad shows from this book that he is a unique and unmatched satirist [among his Persian peers].”

In a Facebook post, Mehdi Khalaji, a scholar of Islamic studies, admires Doozakhrafat’s “powerful humor.” “I started reading the book this evening,” writes Khalaji, “it’s a powerful satirical work that applies humor to religious material. Returning the jokes that God plays on us, the book makes fun of God and his kingdom. Well, what goes around comes around!”
