= Alberto Pinto (interior designer) =

French interior designer (1944–2012)

- Born: 1943; Casablanca, Morocco
- Died: 2012 (aged 68–69); France
- Occupations: Photographer, interior designer

Alberto Pinto (1943–2012) was a photographer and interior designer based in Paris. He designed the interiors of apartments, corporations, hotels, yachts, and jets. He had a home collection of his own and collaborated with many manufacturers, such as Raynaud and Pierre Frey.

== History ==
Alberto Pinto was born in Casablanca to Moroccan Sephardic Jewish parents. He attended École du Louvre in Paris and then moved to New York to start a photography agency. His photography agency specialized in decoration and interior design. This focus on design led Pinto to take up interior design almost four decades ago.

Pinto designed the Art Deco setting for the New York nightclub Regine's.

The seventeenth century private residence at the Place des Victoires in Paris was the home of Pinto's interior design and decoration agency. The agency consisted of 60 people who worked on the design of large scale and atypical places, such as private residences, corporations, hotels, yachts, and private jets. Projects include the Oceanco's Yacht Y708 and the Seaside Hotel Palm Beach, in Maspalomas.

In addition to interior design, Pinto had his own home collection, complete with furniture, tableware, table linen, and home accessories. Pinto also collaborated with many home and tabletop manufacturers such as Raynaud, Pierre Frey, THG, Ercuis, Aït Manos, and D. Porthault.

== Publications ==
- Alberto Pinto Michel Aveline Editions 1992 ISBN 2-907010-26-3
- Alberto Pinto Classics Flammarion Editions 2001 ISBN 2-08-010837-9
- Alberto Pinto Moderns Flammarion Editions 2002 ISBN 2-08-011019-5
- Alberto Pinto Orientalism Flammarion Editions 2004 ISBN 2-08-201318-9
- Alberto Pinto Bedrooms Flammarion Editions 2005 ISBN 2-08-201431-2
- Alberto Pinto Corporate Flammarion Editions 2006 ISBN 2-08-201509-2
- Alberto Pinto: Table Settings Rizzoli 2010 ISBN 978-0-8478-3480-8
- Alberto Pinto Today Flammarion 2011 ISBN 978-2-08-020074-7
- Alberto Pinto: World Interiors (Architecture in Focus) Flammarion 2011 ISBN 978-2-08-020093-8
