= Metropolitan Life (book) =

1978 essay collection by Fran Lebowitz

- First edition
- Author: Fran Lebowitz
- Language: English
- Genre: Essays
- Publisher: E.P. Dutton
- Publication date: March 13, 1978
- Publication place: United States
- Media type: Print (hardcover and paperback)
- Pages: 177
- ISBN: 0525155627

Metropolitan Life is a 1978 book by American writer Fran Lebowitz. It is a collection of satirical essays about life in New York City and was Lebowitz's first book. Many of the essays had previously appeared in Interview and Mademoiselle, where Lebowitz had established a reputation for her sardonic observations on contemporary urban life. The book offers a comic view of the manners, habits, and pretensions of life in a large city.

Published by E.P. Dutton, Metropolitan Life was an instant success, becoming a New York Times bestseller. It was later released in a 1994 compilation titled The Fran Lebowitz Reader along with Lebowitz's 1981 essay collection Social Studies.

== Background ==
Born and raised in Morristown, New Jersey, Fran Lebowitz was expelled from high school and moved to New York City at the age of 18 with aspirations of being a writer. She supported herself through a variety of jobs, including selling belts on the street, doing bulk mailing, cleaning apartments, driving a taxi, and reading poetry at a nightclub. She sold advertising for Changes, and then began writing satirical essays, where she developed a small following for her wit. Her readership expanded through her columns "The Best of the Worst" and "I Cover the Waterfront" in Andy Warhol's Interview magazine, and "Lebowitz Report" in Mademoiselle. British Vogue described her as "the natural successor to Dorothy Parker," while Lebowitz clubs were established at Yale University, the University of Michigan, and New York University.

Lebowitz began writing Metropolitan Life after her friend Laurie Colwin, then an editor at E. P. Dutton, encouraged her to write a book. Most of the essays collected in the book had previously appeared in Interview and Mademoiselle.

The title Metropolitan Life was selected through a contest Lebowitz placed in Interview. At the time, she wrote the column "I Cover the Waterfront" for the magazine. Unable to settle on a title for the book, she advertised a "Win Date With Fran" contest inviting readers to submit suggestions. Hundreds of readers responded. The winning title, Metropolitan Life, was submitted by Edwin Kennebeck, an archivist and associate editor at E. P. Dutton. Kennebeck did not claim the date offered as the contest's prize.

The book was dedicated to Lebowitz's parents and sister. Despite leaving home as a young woman and pursuing an unconventional life in New York, Lebowitz remained close to her family.

== Publication ==
Metropolitan Life was published by E.P. Dutton on March 13, 1978.

== Themes and style ==
Metropolitan Life focuses on the peculiarities of contemporary urban existence, particularly the social codes and consumer fashions of New York City. Among the subjects Lebowitz treats satirically are disco etiquette, encounters with landlords, nail salons, mood jewelry, heterosexuality, and the neighborhood of SoHo.

Lebowitz's writing is characterized by deadpan observations, concise prose, exaggerated certainty, and deliberately blunt judgments. Her treatment of everyday situations and social conventions established the distinctive comic voice that became associated with her work.

== Reception ==
Metropolitan Life was a major success and appeared on the New York Times Best Seller list for several weeks. The book helped establish Lebowitz as a prominent humorist and social commentator.
