= The Miseries of Human Life =

1806 book by James Beresford

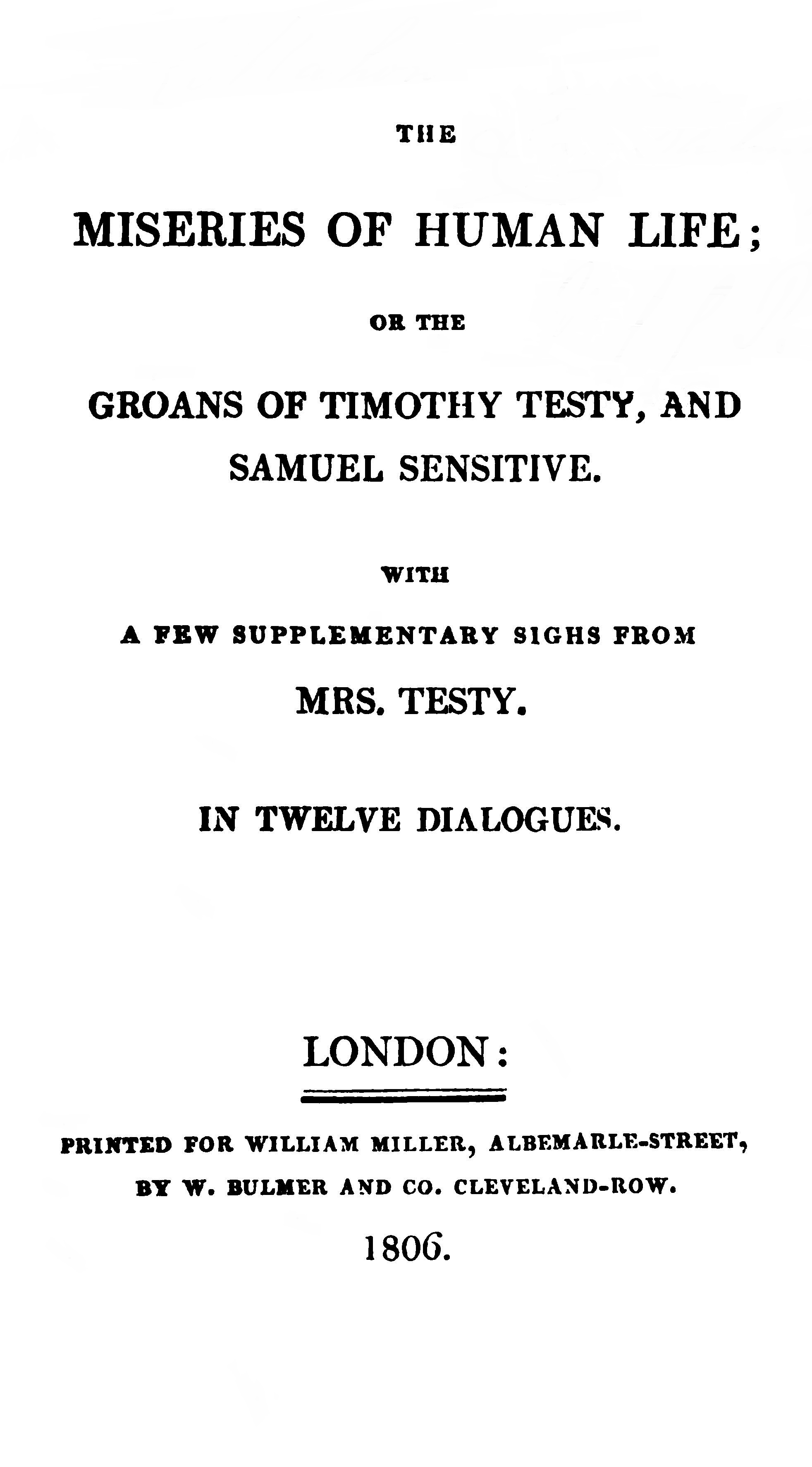
First edition title page

The Miseries of Human Life was written by James Beresford and published in 1806, first as a single volume and then as an expanded two-volume edition later that year. Illustrated by George Cruikshank, it catalogued "in excruciating detail" the "petty outrages, minor humiliations, and tiny discomforts that make up everyday human existence". The Miseries were written as a series of dialogues between Mr Samuel Sensitive and Mr Timothy Testy, in which they catalogue the daily "injuries, insults, disappointments and treacheries" of everyday life. Mrs Testy makes occasional appearances to offer "Supplementary Sighs" from a feminine perspective.

The Gentleman's Magazine of May 1841 described The Miseries as "an extraordinary success". English poet Richard Henry Horne noted that the book sold "like wildfire". Profits for the book exceeded £5000 (equivalent to £574,000 in 2023 (Note: UK Retail Price Index inflation figures are based on data from Clark, Gregory (2017), "The Annual RPI and Average Earnings for Britain, 1209 to Present (New Series)", MeasuringWorth)).

== See also ==
- 1806 in literature
