= Public Speaking (film) =

2010 film directed by Martin Scorsese

- Official poster
- Directed by: Martin Scorsese
- Produced by: Margaret Bodde; Graydon Carter; Fran Lebowitz; Martin Scorsese
- Starring: Fran Lebowitz
- Cinematography: Ellen Kuras
- Edited by: Damian Rodriguez; David Tedeschi
- Production companies: HBO Documentary Films; American Express Portraits; Consolidated Documentaries; Sikelia Productions
- Distributed by: HBO; Rialto Pictures
- Release date: November 22, 2010 (United States)
- Running time: 82 minutes
- Country: United States
- Language: English
- Box office: $62,173

Public Speaking is a 2010 documentary film directed and produced by Martin Scorsese, about the American author Fran Lebowitz.

The film was broadcast on HBO on November 22, 2010, prior to a limited release on February 23, 2011, by Rialto Pictures. It received positive reviews from critics. The film was nominated for Best Documentary in the Gotham Independent Film Awards 2010.

== Synopsis ==
The film follows writer Fran Lebowitz known for her unique takes on modern life, with clips from speaking engagements.

== Production ==
Graydon Carter initially pitched the idea to Lebowitz, with Wes Anderson attached for three years to direct the film. Due to a scheduling conflict, Martin Scorsese replaced Anderson.

Principal photography took place at The Waverly Inn in New York City.

== Release ==
The film was broadcast on HBO on November 22, 2010. In January 2011, Rialto Pictures acquired U.S. theatrical distribution rights to the film, and set it for a February 23, 2011, limited release.

== Critical reception ==
Public Speaking received positive reviews from film critics. It holds a 92% approval rating on review aggregator website Rotten Tomatoes, based on 12 reviews, with a weighted average of 7.90/10. On Metacritic, the film holds a rating of 75 out of 100, based on 9 critics, indicating "generally favorable reviews".

== Accolades ==
=== Accolades ===
Year	Award	Category	Recipient(s)	Result	Ref.
2010	Gotham Awards	Gotham Independent Film Award for Best Documentary	Public Speaking	Nominated	
