= Pablo Reyes Jr. =

Mexican Writer, prankster and contributor to fake news websites

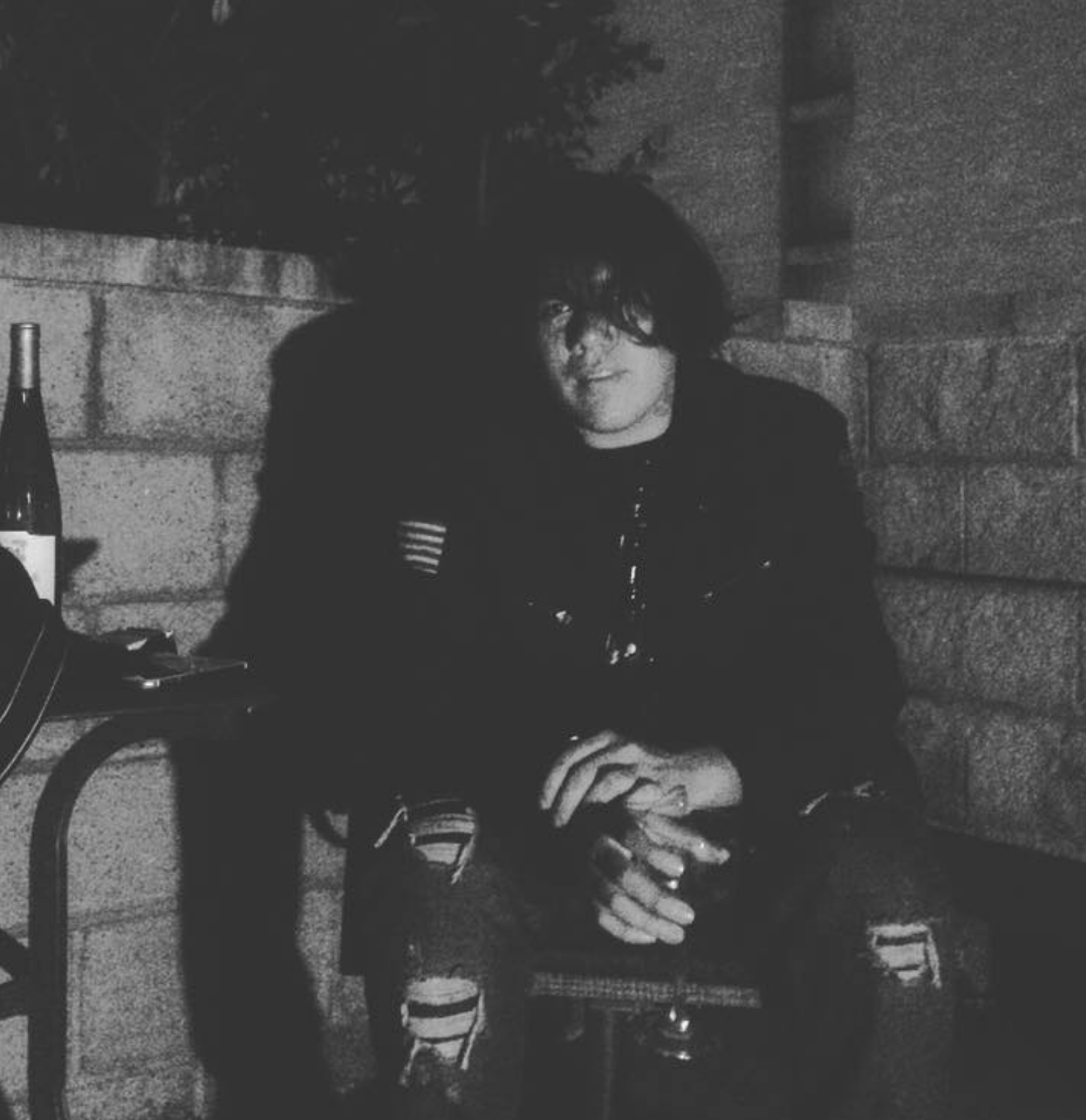
- Born: Pablo Reyes Santiago; Tampamolón Corona, Mexico
- Occupation: Writer
- Writing career
- Genres: Fiction, Satire, Fake News
- Website: pabloreyes.mx

Pablo Reyes Jr. is a Mexican writer, prankster and contributor to fake news websites. He is the founder of Huzlers, a fictional news website that attracted about 387,000 unique visitors per month, according to Comscore. That makes it the No. 1 American site tracked by Comscore in a new genre that Huzler's founder calls "fauxtire" — not quite The Onion, but not quite PBS.

== Future prediction hoax ==
Reyes created a post on Facebook that was shared over 170,000 times, for good reason: it appears to predict the future. His predictions for 2016 that have already happened include the deaths of Prince, Muhammad Ali and Kimbo Slice, a terrible mass shooting and everyone freaking out about a gorilla. He also goes on to say that Hillary Clinton will be elected, and Donald Trump will die. His hoax was quickly debunked by BuzzFeed and Daily Mirror who explained how he edited an old Facebook post.

== Pokemon Go crime wave hoaxes ==
Pokémon Go was a phenomenon. The mobile game inspired a parade of viral hoax stories, many of which came from a single sketchy website CartelPress a website with connections to one of the more notorious faux news organizations Huzlers. Reyes later came clean and said these Pokémon Go hoaxes went viral by mistake. Many of the published articles on CartelPress were mistaken as real news.

== Huzlers ==
Articles from Huzlers often involve popular restaurants and brands to disgust readers with its gross-out stories. One story by the site falsely reported that Coors Light was laced with cocaine. Another story made up an incident where a person working at a McDonald's restaurant put his mixtapes in Happy Meals. The site describes itself as "fauxtire and fictional news blog".
