= Fran Lebowitz =

American author and public speaker (born 1950)

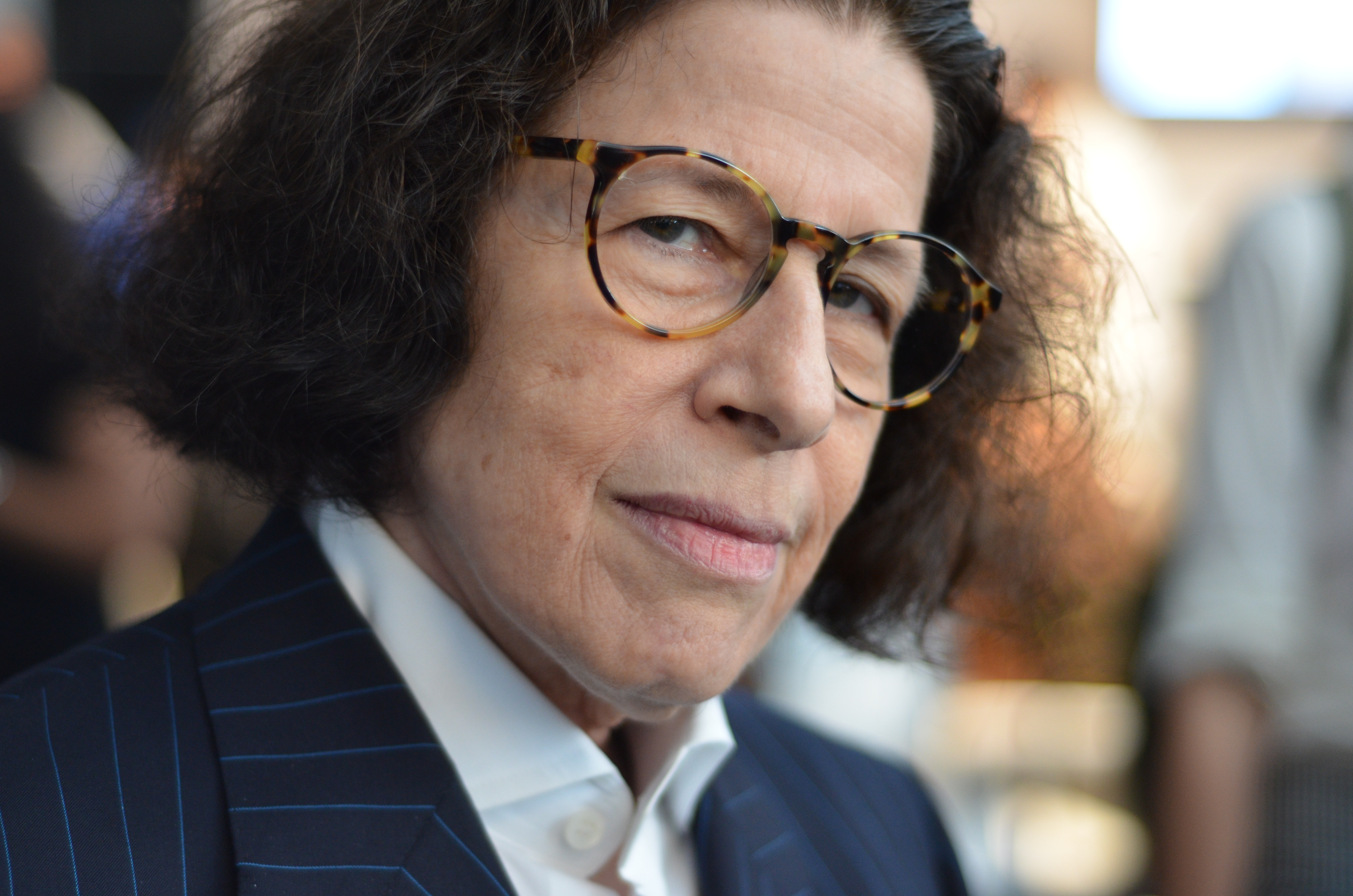
- Lebowitz in 2011
- Born: Frances Ann Lebowitz; October 27, 1950 (age 76); Morristown, New Jersey, U.S.
- Occupations: Writer; public speaker; actor
- Writing career
- Genre: Essays
- Notable works: Metropolitan Life (1978); Social Studies (1981)
- Website: franlebowitz.com

Frances Ann Lebowitz (/ˈliːbəwɪts/; born October 27, 1950) is an American writer, public speaker, cultural critic, and actor. She is known for her sardonic social commentary on American life, particularly from a New York City perspective, and for her association with prominent figures in the city's art and cultural scenes during the 1970s and 1980s. Lebowitz gained prominence with her books Metropolitan Life (1978) and Social Studies (1981), which are collected in The Fran Lebowitz Reader (1994).

Lebowitz first became known as a writer in Manhattan's downtown art scene in the 1970s and later became an internationally sought-after public speaker and media personality. She has been the subject of two projects directed by Martin Scorsese: the HBO documentary film Public Speaking (2010) and the Netflix documentary series Pretend It's a City (2021).

== Early life and education ==
Frances Ann Lebowitz was born on October 27, 1950 in Morristown, New Jersey, where she spent her childhood. She has a sister, Ellen, almost four years her junior. Her parents were Ruth and Harold Lebowitz, who owned Pearl's Upholstered Furniture, a furniture store and upholstery workshop. She developed a love of reading from an early age, to the point that she would surreptitiously read during class and neglect her homework. Lebowitz describes her "Jewish identity [as] ethnic or cultural or whatever people call it now. But it's not religious." She has been an atheist since age 7. She did not have a bat mitzvah, but did go to Sunday school until 15 and had a confirmation. She told Gyles Brandreth that she has been friends since childhood with Deborah A. Farrington (Harvard Business School 1976) and has smoked since she was 12.

Lebowitz was a poor student overall, particularly in algebra, which she failed six times. She has called it "the first thing which they presented to me that I absolutely could not understand at all, and had no interest in understanding". She worked at a Carvel ice cream store. Her grades were so poor that her parents enrolled her in The Wilson School (now defunct and whose facilities have been purchased by The Craig School), a private girls' Episcopal school, in Mountain Lakes, where her grades marginally improved but she had difficulty following the rules and was eventually expelled for "nonspecific surliness". She also was suspended from Morristown High School for sneaking out of pep rallies.

As an adolescent, Lebowitz was deeply affected by James Baldwin: "James Baldwin was the first person I ever saw on television who I heard talk like that—by which I mean, he was the first intellectual I ever heard talk... And I was just flabbergasted. That made me read him." She also enjoyed watching television appearances by Gore Vidal and William F. Buckley, though she did not agree with Buckley.

After being expelled from high school, Lebowitz earned a certificate of high school equivalency. When she was 18, her parents sent her to live with her aunt in Poughkeepsie, New York, where she stayed for six months.

== Career ==
=== Early career ===
In 1969, Lebowitz moved to New York City. Her father agreed to pay for her first two months in the city on the condition that she live at the women's-only Martha Washington Hotel. She then stayed with friends in New York apartments and Boston college dormitories, surviving by writing papers for students. At age 20, she rented a one-bedroom apartment in the West Village.

To support herself during her early years in New York, Lebowitz held a variety of jobs, working as a cleaner, chauffeur, taxi driver, and pornography writer. She also worked in bulk mailing, sold belts on the street, cleaned apartments, and read poetry at a Greenwich Village nightclub. She later recalled that the club's performers included "a 75-year-old torch-singer and me." She considered herself a particularly good poetry reader and said the performances earned her a small following, which expanded when she read to an audience of about 2,000 young people at a nightclub in a Catskill Mountains hotel.

Lebowitz refused to work as a waitress, claiming that sexual intercourse with a restaurant manager was often a prerequisite for being hired and that she "can't smile at people for money". At 21, she got a job selling advertising for Changes, a small magazine devoted to what she called "radical-chic politics and culture" founded by Susan Graham Ungaro, the jazz musician Charles Mingus's wife. While working at the magazine, Lebowitz began writing satirical essays in her spare time. She initially wrote book reviews before taking over the publication's film reviews when the regular film critic took a leave of absence.

=== Interview magazine and New York milieu ===
Lebowitz has said the film reviews attracted a larger readership, prompting her to seek a similar position at Andy Warhol's Interview magazine in 1972. Through a friend who wrote for Interview, Lebowitz arranged an appointment with editor Glenn O'Brien. She told O'Brien that she wanted to write humorous reviews of bad films and requested her own, unedited page at the back of the magazine. O'Brien agreed, and she was paid $10 per review. Her film criticism evolved into the column The Best of the Worst, which focused on poorly received films. She later wrote the column I Cover the Waterfront.

Lebowitz never formed a close friendship with Warhol, unlike some of his other associates at the Factory, and was often quiet in his presence. According to former Interview editor Bob Colacello, Lebowitz told him that she had deliberately avoided becoming too close to Warhol before establishing herself as a writer, fearing that "my sense of humor would somehow become Andy Warhol's sense of humor."

While writing for Interview, Lebowitz also briefly worked for Mademoiselle magazine. She gained recognition for her sardonic social commentary on American life, shaped by her New York City perspective. British Vogue called her "the natural successor to Dorothy Parker" and there were clubs dedicated to her at Yale University, the University of Michigan, and New York University.

During this period, Lebowitz became friends with numerous artists and writers, including photographers Peter Hujar and Robert Mapplethorpe, who frequently gave her photographs, many of which she discarded in the 1970s. Through her association with figures in the city's art and cultural scene, she became linked to many prominent personalities of the 1970s and 1980s, including Martin Scorsese, Jerome Robbins, David Wojnarowicz, Candy Darling, and the New York Dolls.

=== Metropolitan Life and Social Studies, and The Fran Lebowitz Reader ===
In 1978, Lebowitz's first book, Metropolitan Life, was published by E. P. Dutton and became a New York Times bestseller. The book collected comedic essays, most of which had previously appeared in Mademoiselle and Interview, with titles including "Success Without College" and "A Few Words on a Few Words." Many of the essays focused on subjects she found irritating or absurd, which she treated with dry, sardonic humor. After the book was published, she became a local celebrity, frequenting Studio 54 and making regular appearances on television talk shows.

Lebowitz's second book, Social Studies, was published in 1981 and also became a New York Times bestseller. Like its predecessor, it collected mostly previously published essays from Mademoiselle and Interview, addressing subjects including teenagers, films, and room service. In 1994, Metropolitan Life and Social Studies were collected in a single volume, The Fran Lebowitz Reader.

=== Later career ===
Since the mid-1990s, Lebowitz has been known for her decades-long writer's block. Her last published book was Mr. Chas and Lisa Sue Meet the Pandas (1994), a children's book about giant pandas living in New York City who long to move to Paris. Since that time, Lebowitz has worked on various book projects that have not been completed. This includes Exterior Signs of Wealth, an unfinished novel purportedly about rich people who want to be artists and artists who want to be rich. Another book, Progress, was excerpted in Vanity Fair in 2004, but has yet to be completed. When discussing her writer's block, she said: "My editor—who, whenever I introduce him as my editor, always says, 'easiest job in town'—he says that the paralysis I have about writing is caused by an excessive reverence for the written word, and I think that's probably true."

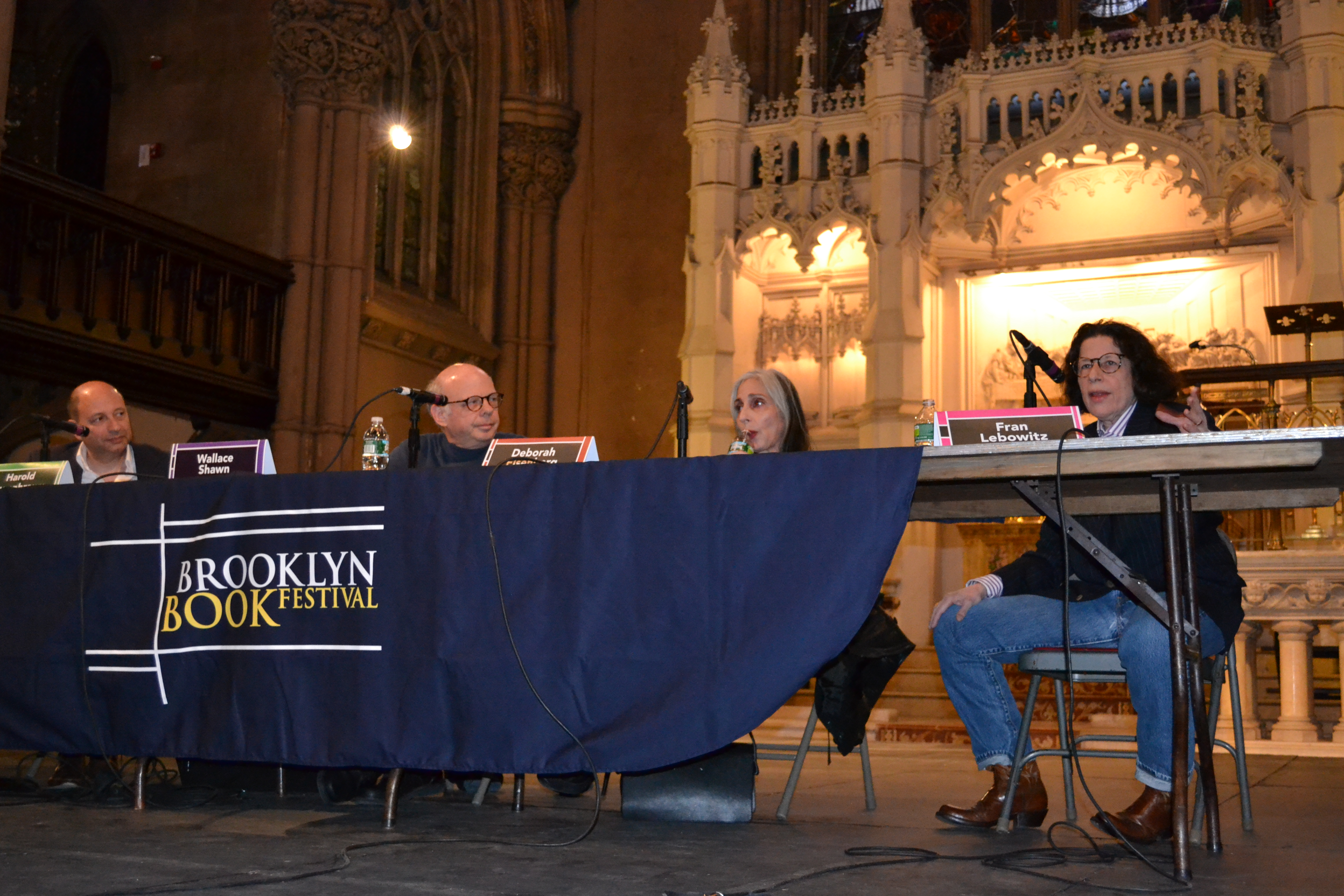
Lebowitz (right) with Harold Augenbraum, Wallace Shawn and Deborah Eisenberg during a panel discussion at the 2011 Brooklyn Book Festival. Since the 1980s, Lebowitz has largely supported herself with speaking engagements.

Due to her writer's block, Lebowitz has largely supported herself with television appearances and speaking engagements. She has said, "It's what I wanted my entire life. People asking me my opinion, and people not allowed to interrupt." She tours as a public speaker, represented by the Steven Barclay Agency. In addition, she has made several appearances on Late Night with David Letterman and had a recurring role as Judge Janice Goldberg on the television drama Law & Order from 2001 to 2007. She does still write journalistic pieces; Lebowitz has been employed as a contributing editor and occasional columnist for Vanity Fair since 1997.

In 2010, Lebowitz was featured in Public Speaking, an HBO documentary about her directed by Martin Scorsese that contains interviews and clips from her speaking engagements. On November 17, 2010, she returned to the Late Show with David Letterman after a 16-year absence to promote the documentary. She discussed her years-long writer's block, which she jokingly called a "writer's blockade". Lebowitz also made an appearance as a judge in Scorsese's 2013 film The Wolf of Wall Street. She collaborated with Scorsese again on the 2021 Netflix series Pretend It's a City, in which Scorsese interviews her about New York City and other subjects.

In May 2026, Lebowitz undertook a speaking tour of Australia and New Zealand, appearing at the Adelaide Festival Centre in Adelaide with Louise Adler.

== Public persona ==
Lebowitz has cultivated a distinctive public persona combining humor and social commentary. Through her public appearances, she has reached a wider audience. She is known for her clever quips and observational humor on a range of topics, including New York City, gentrification, art, literature, and politics. She typically wears men's suit jackets (made bespoke by the Savile Row firm of Anderson & Sheppard), white shirts, cowboy boots, Levi's jeans, and tortoiseshell glasses. She often speaks of her treasured pearl-grey 1979 Checker cab, the only car she ever owned, calling it "the only monogamous relationship I've ever had in my life". In September 2007, Lebowitz was named one of the year's most stylish women in Vanity Fair's 68th Annual International Best-Dressed List. An annual event, FranCon, celebrates Lebowitz's sartorial sense, with participants dressing in her signature style.

== Beliefs and ideology ==
=== New York City ===
Lebowitz has been critical of the gentrification and changing culture of New York City. She explained that the main difference between "Old New York" and "New New York" is the influence and dominance of the culture of money. While New York was always an expensive city, people who were not rich could live in Manhattan and "you didn't have to think about money every second." This was because, among other reasons, "there were a zillion bad jobs. That doesn't exist any more. I mean, I could wake up one afternoon with zero money—I don't just mean in the house, I mean to my name—and know that by the end of the day, I would have money."

She has been critical of New York mayors Rudy Giuliani and Michael Bloomberg for making New York more "suburban" and accelerating gentrification in Manhattan. She has also been critical of the large numbers of wealthy people in New York City, as she believes they do not create anything of value but only consume things. Of Bloomberg, she said:

I object to people who are rich in politics. I don't think they should be allowed to be in politics. It is bad that rich people are in politics, it is bad for everybody but rich people, and rich people don't need any more help. Whenever people say, "Oh, he earned his money himself," I always say the same thing: "No one earns a billion dollars. People earn $10 an hour, people steal a billion dollars."

Of Giuliani's law enforcement policies she said, "When Giuliani was the mayor, every five minutes an unarmed black man was shot in the back." Lebowitz abhors New York City's high number of tourists, calling the shift in the 1980s toward promoting the city as a tourist destination "an incredibly horrible idea". She has cited tourism as a cause of New York's housing shortage because hotels are built rather than apartment buildings, and described the negative effects of gearing the city's economy towards tourists: "You cannot lure these herds of hillbillies into the middle of a city, and not have it affect the city."

Of the homelessness crisis in New York, she has said, "Any New Yorker who walks down the street in this rich city ... you can't even hear anything because the money's making so much noise now, and see people in the street and not feel this is a disgrace to the country, it's a disgrace to the city."

=== Impact of HIV/AIDS ===
In the 1980s and 1990s, many of Lebowitz's gay male artist friends, including Peter Hujar, Paul Thek and David Wojnarowicz, died of HIV/AIDS. She has discussed the impact that the epidemic in New York had on American culture. In particular, she has spoken about the cultural void that was left behind from losing a generation of talented artists and intellectuals. Many of these men not only produced art and intellectual culture, but were also the passionate audiences that nurtured such culture. As she explained in a 2016 interview:

What is culture without gay people? This is America, what is the culture? Not just New York. AIDS completely changed American culture... And with AIDS, a whole generation of gay men died practically all at once, within a couple of years. And especially the ones that I knew. The first people who died of AIDS were artists. They were also the most interesting people... The knowing audience also died and no longer exists in a real way... There's a huge gap in what people know, and there's no context for it anymore.

In 1987, Lebowitz published a piece in The New York Times titled "The Impact of AIDS on the Artistic Community".

=== Feminism ===
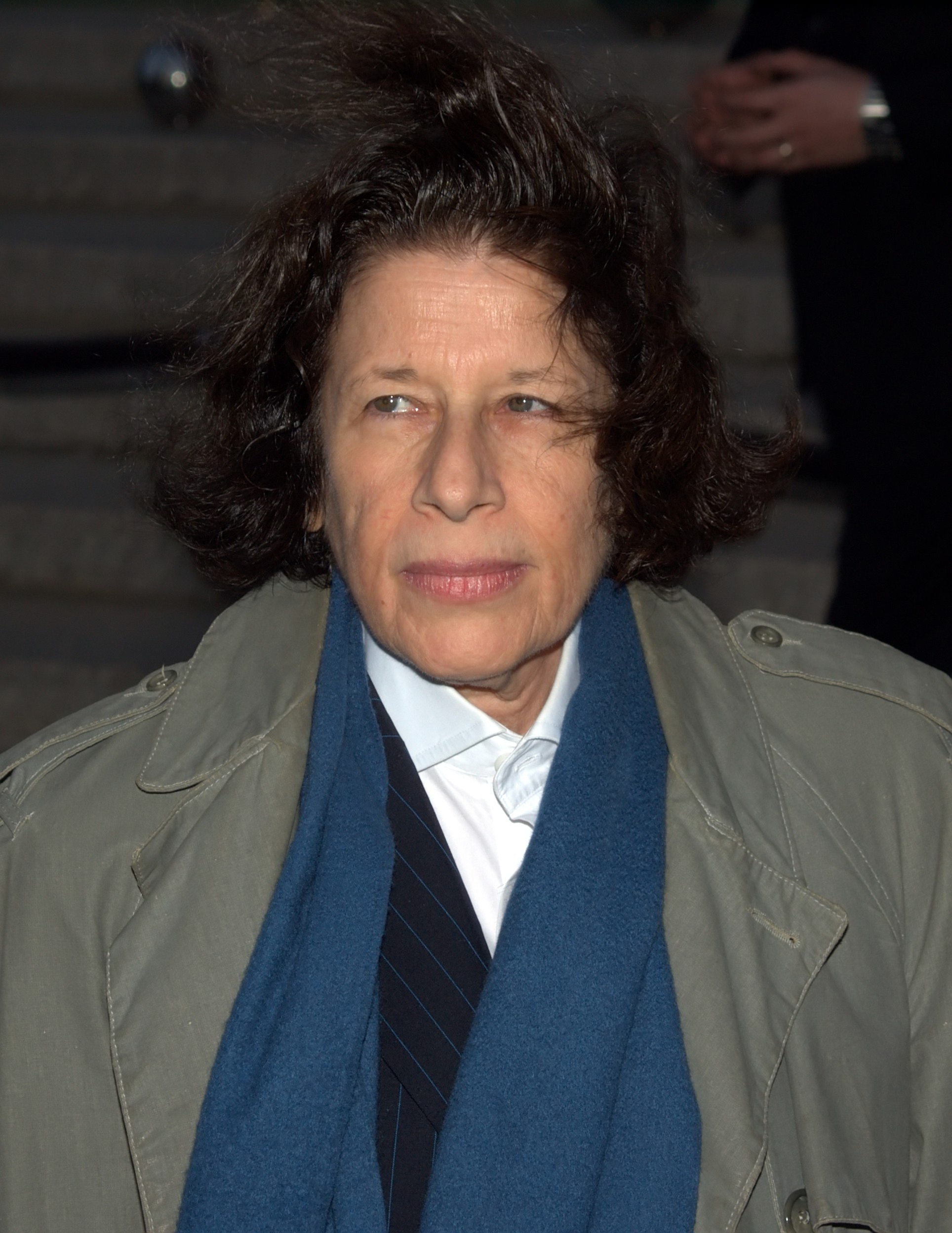
Lebowitz at the 2010 Tribeca Festival

Lebowitz has been called the "opposite of lean-in feminism". She said in a 2019 interview:

If [feminism] really worked, there wouldn't be feminism anymore. There's a couple of things that have changed so much for the better, and the life of a girl is a billion times better than when I was a girl. There's no comparison. It's so much better, and yet it's still horrible. That will tell you what it was like, okay?

In another interview, she said, "I didn't pay much attention to it, largely because it never occurred to me it would work. I was, unfortunately, largely right." She has also said, "The way girls are raised now. It's so different... When I was a child, if you wanted to do something and you were not allowed to do it, very often, the answer to why not would be: because you're a girl."

Of the MeToo movement, she said,

It never occurred to me this would ever change. Being a woman was exactly the same from Eve till eight months ago. So it never occurred to me that it would change. Ever. I can tell you that it's probably one of the most surprising things in my life. The first forty guys who got caught—I knew almost all of them.

=== Politics ===
Lebowitz identifies as a liberal Democrat and is often critical of moderate Democratic politicians and policy. She has been a vociferous critic of the Republican Party for many years and more recently [March 2018] of President Donald Trump. She has said that Trump's appeal to his voters is "racism, pure and simple", and described Trump campaign rallies as reminiscent of those held by the Ku Klux Klan and George Wallace. She has called Trump "a cheap hustler", "stupid", "lazy", and "a little crazy, but mostly he's dumb". Of Trump's election in 2016, she said, "It was horrible. I felt that strongly affected emotionally for at least a month. My level of rage, always high, is now in fever pitch all the time." She joked, "If there's one upside to all this [Trump's election], it's that it's gotten Trump out of New York."

Lebowitz has been critical of many other politicians. She has expressed antipathy for Bill Clinton's presidency for moving the Democratic Party to the right, saying, "to me he seemed like a Republican...when he signed that welfare bill I went insane. He was a successful moderate Republican president." Lebowitz has spoken of her dislike for Bernie Sanders, calling him at one point "an unbelievably irritating, narcissistic old man" who took votes away from her candidate of choice, Hillary Clinton. She often describes Ronald Reagan as "the template for the stupid President," saying that "before Reagan there was no idea the president could be stupid."

Lebowitz has said she believes the Second Amendment has been misinterpreted, and guarantees individuals the right not to bear arms but rather to form militias. Of the gun rights debate, she has said:

Who are these people that love guns? These people who love Trump and they love guns, these are the most frightened people I have ever seen in my life ... I could have gotten a gun but I never got one. I was an 18-year-old penniless girl in the middle of a dangerous city and I was never as afraid as these men in Texas, living in a state of terror.

In May 2019, Lebowitz jokingly suggested on Real Time with Bill Maher that Trump should suffer the same fate as Jamal Khashoggi, The Washington Post columnist who the CIA and multiple other intelligence agencies believe was tortured and assassinated by Saudi operatives on Saudi Crown Prince Mohammed bin Salman's orders. She walked back her comments later in the program.

Lebowitz voted for Zohran Mamdani in the 2025 New York City mayoral election.

== Personal life ==
Lebowitz is open about her personal life and is a lesbian. She has spoken about having difficulty with romantic relationships. In 2016, she said, "I'm the world's greatest daughter. I'm a great relative. I believe I'm a great friend. I'm a horrible girlfriend. I always was."

Lebowitz was a close, longtime friend of Toni Morrison.

She is "famously resistant to technology", having no cellphone, computer, or typewriter.

Lebowitz is blind in her right eye, a condition she was born with.

Lebowitz is also known for her massive book collection, 10,000 volumes in all, including at least one shelf of soap-carving books, and her refusal to use many technologies, including cellphones and computers. A heavy smoker, Lebowitz is an advocate for smokers' rights. She has not otherwise used drugs or alcohol since she was 19, which she says is because she reached her "lifetime supply" of both by that age.

== Work ==
=== Filmography ===
Film

| Year | Title | Role | Notes |
|---|---|---|---|
| 1990 | Paris Is Burning | Herself | Documentary |
| 2010 | Public Speaking | Herself | HBO Documentary Film |
| 2013 | The Wolf of Wall Street | Honorable Samantha Stogel | Feature film |
| 2014 | River of Fundament | Wake Guest (herself) | Feature film |
| 2014 | Regarding Susan Sontag | Herself | HBO Documentary Film |
| 2016 | Mapplethorpe: Look at the Pictures | Herself | Documentary |
| 2017 | The Gospel According to André | Herself | Documentary |
| 2018 | Always at the Carlyle | Herself | Documentary |
| 2019 | Toni Morrison: The Pieces I Am | Herself | Documentary |
| 2019 | The Booksellers | Herself | Documentary |
| 2020 | Wojnarowicz: F**k You F*ggot F**ker | Herself | Documentary |
| 2023 | AKA Mr. Chow | Herself | HBO Documentary Film |

Television

| Year | Title | Role | Notes |
|---|---|---|---|
| 1980 | The David Letterman Show | Herself - Guest | Episode: June 30, 1980 |
| 1982–1991 | Late Night with David Letterman | Herself - Guest | 15 episodes |
| 1982 | The Mike Douglas Show | Herself - Guest | Episode: David Hasselhoff/Fran Lebowitz |
| 1994–2010 | Charlie Rose | Herself - Guest | 6 episodes |
| 1994–2000 | Late Night with Conan O'Brien | Herself - Guest | 7 episodes |
| 1994–2010 | Late Show with David Letterman | Herself - Guest | 2 episodes |
| 1995 | The Tonight Show with Jay Leno | Herself - Guest | 1 episode |
| 2001–2007 | Law & Order | Judge Janice Goldberg | 12 episodes |
| 2006 | Law & Order: Criminal Intent | Judge Janice Goldberg | Episode: "To the Bone" |
| 2010–2013 | Late Night with Jimmy Fallon | Herself - Guest | 3 episodes |
| 2015–2025 | The Tonight Show with Jimmy Fallon | Herself - Guest | 11 episodes |
| 2015–2024 | Real Time with Bill Maher | Herself - Guest | 9 episodes |
| 2021 | Pretend It's a City | Herself | Producer; Netflix docuseries |
| 2021 | Late Night with Seth Meyers | Herself - Guest | Episode: Bill Hader/Fran Lebowitz |
| 2021 | Ziwe | Herself - Guest | Episode: "55%" |

=== Bibliography ===
- Metropolitan Life, Dutton, 1978. ISBN 978-0-525-15562-1
- Social Studies, Random House, 1981. ISBN 978-0-394-51245-7
- The Fran Lebowitz Reader, Vintage Books, 1994, ISBN 978-0-679-76180-8
- Mr. Chas and Lisa Sue Meet the Pandas, Knopf, 1994. ISBN 978-0-679-86052-5
- Lebowitz, Fran; Warhol, Andy (2004). Brant, Sandra J.; Sischy, Ingrid (eds.). Andy Warhol's Interview: The Crystal Ball of Pop Culture. Volume 7: Fran Lebowitz: I Cover the Waterfront. Paris: Edition 7L. ISBN 3865210236. OCLC 314795464. Archived from the original on January 16, 2021.
- Exterior Signs of Wealth (unfinished and unpublished)
- Progress (unfinished and unpublished), New York : Knopf, 2003, OCLC 52860152 ISBN 9781400041367
