= Fake news websites in the United States =

Fake news websites target United States audiences by using disinformation to create or inflame controversial topics such as the 2016 election. Most fake news websites target readers by impersonating or pretending to be real news organizations, which can lead to legitimate news organizations further spreading their message. Most notable in the media are the many websites that made completely false claims about political candidates such as Hillary Clinton and Donald Trump, as part of a larger campaign to gain viewers and ad revenue or spread disinformation. Additionally, satire websites have received criticism for not properly notifying readers that they are publishing false or satirical content, since many readers have been duped by seemingly legitimate articles.

== History ==
The rise of fake news websites in the United States has been associated with the rapid growth of social media platforms during the 2010s. Researchers have noted that false stories often spread faster online than factual reporting because sensational headlines attract higher engagement from users.

During and after the 2016 United States presidential election, several investigations found that fake news publishers earned substantial advertising revenue from viral political stories shared on platforms such as Facebook and Twitter. Some websites were operated from outside the United States, particularly in Eastern Europe, where operators created fabricated stories designed to attract American audiences.

== Social media ==
Social media platforms have played a major role in the dissemination of fake news websites and articles. Algorithms designed to promote engaging content have sometimes amplified misleading or false stories. Critics have argued that recommendation systems and automated sharing features contribute to the rapid circulation of fabricated content during major political or social events.

In response to criticism, major technology companies introduced fact-checking partnerships, content moderation policies, and labeling systems intended to reduce the visibility of misleading information.

== Definition ==
Fake news websites deliberately publish hoaxes, propaganda, and disinformation to drive web traffic inflamed by social media. These sites are distinguished from news satire as fake news articles are usually fabricated to deliberately mislead readers, either for profit or more ambiguous reasons, such as disinformation campaigns. Many sites originate in or are promoted by Russia, North Macedonia, Romania, and the United States. Many sites directly targeted the United States both because the U.S. is a high-value ad consumer and extraordinary claims are more likely to be believed during a political crisis.

The New York Times noted in a December 2016 article that fake news had previously maintained a presence on the Internet and within tabloid journalism in years prior to the 2016 U.S. election. However, prior to the election between Hillary Clinton and Donald Trump, fake news had not impacted the election process to such a high degree. Subsequent to that election, the issue of fake news turned into a political weapon between supporters of Clinton and Trump; due to these back-and-forth complaints, the definition of fake news as used for such argumentation became vaguer.

== Methods ==
Fake news websites use a variety of methods to fool their readers into believing their content, either by attempting to persuade the readers that they are legitimate or by distracting readers with incredible news.

=== Clickbait ===
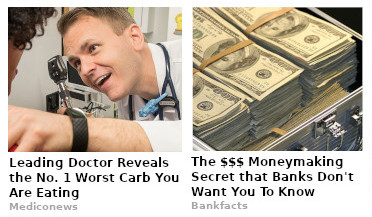
Fictional examples of clickbait chumbox adverts

Fake news websites often have article titles that are incredible, prompting the user to click on it and read more. This method of enticing readers to view content on their website often leads to exaggerated or even fake titles. When linked to from other sites, usually social media, having an extraordinary story title played a large part in tricking users who cannot tell if the article is real or not. This became especially relevant in the 2016 U.S. election. Additionally, out-of-context or manipulated images can cause readers to incorrectly assume an article's legitimacy, often due to their inflammatory image choice.

Facebook's Vice President of News Feed says the social media giant defines clickbait "as headlines that withhold significant amounts of information and mislead the user". Because it is difficult to determine what content exactly is fake news, the website uses a data set to calculate the likelihood of a headline being clickbait.

=== Impersonation ===
Another method of gaining readers is impersonating a legitimate news organization. This can come in two forms, either by copying a popular news organization's website formatting and pretending to be a lesser known publication or by completely copying an existing website down to its name and authors. Exact copies can trick viewers into believing the website is an official organization such as the Bloomberg.ma or cnn-trending.com.

ABCnews.com.co was a fake news website that "crudely" spoofed legitimate journalistic organization ABC News, but was in reality completely unrelated. The site published only fake stories, usually with a realistic clickbait headline, albeit with story-details containing enough flaws that the "discerning reader would likely notice" it was false.

The Denver Guardian was a blog site registered in 2016 that claimed to be a legitimate newspaper in Denver, but only ran a single fabricated story that went viral.

=== Typosquatting ===
Typosquatting, a form of cybersquatting, is based on Internet users mistyping the name of a popular Web site. A typosquatter will monitor how many clicks a "typo" domain name receives and use the information to sell advertising for the sites that receive a high volume of "accidental" traffic. Many popular fake news websites like ABCnews.com.co attempted to impersonate a legitimate U.S. news publication, relying on readers not actually checking the address they typed or clicked on. They exploited common misspellings, slight misphrasings and abuse of top-level domains such as .com.co as opposed to .com. Many social media users were duped, believing they were going to an actual news publication's website.

=== Obscurity ===
Since the authors of these websites are not actual reporters, many fake news sites either pretend to have the identity of a reporter or simply do not include an 'About Us' page. When these sites are publicized by actual organizations, they receive a bit of legitimacy along with more viewers.

== Fake news campaigns ==
The election cycle of the US office of president has become a focal point around which many campaigns of fake news are organized.

=== 2016 election cycle ===
Fake news websites played a large part in the online news community during the election, reinforced by extreme exposure on Facebook and Google. Approximately 115 pro-Trump fake stories were shared on Facebook a total of 30 million times, and 41 pro-Clinton fake stories shared a total of 7.6 million times. There were two main reasons for creating fake news: economical and ideological. The teenagers in Veles, for example, produced stories favoring both Trump and Clinton that earned them tens of thousands of dollars. Some fake news providers seek to advance candidates they favor. The Romanian man who ran endingthefed.com, for example, claims that he started the site mainly to help Donald Trump's campaign.

==== Major fake news sites involved ====
- ABCnews.com.co – pro-right
- Conservative Daily Post – both anti-left and anti-right
- Denver Guardian – known for anti-Hillary Clinton articles
- Disinfomedia – anti-right articles that aimed to trick alt-rights
- News Examiner – anti-left articles
- NewsPunch – inflammatory for both sides as well as conspiratorial
- SubjectPolitics.com – known for anti-Hillary Clinton articles

==== Social media ====
Professor Philip N. Howard of the University of Oxford found that about one half of all news on Twitter directed at Michigan prior to the election was junk or fake. The other half came from real news sources. Criticized for failing to stop fake news from spreading on its platform during the 2016 election, Facebook thought that the problem could be solved by engineering, until May 2017 when it announced plans to hire 3,000 content reviewers. Fraudulent stories during the 2016 U.S. presidential election popularized on Facebook included a viral post that Pope Francis and actor Denzel Washington had endorsed Donald Trump.

BuzzFeed News found that on Facebook during the last three months of the election, fake news stories received more attention than real news stories. It was discovered that the top twenty fake news stories had 8,711,000 shares, reactions, and comments, while the top twenty real news stories were only shared, commented on, and reacted to 7,367,000 times. One prominent fraudulent news story released after the election—that protesters at anti-Trump rallies in Austin, Texas, were "bused in"—started as a tweet by one individual with 40 Twitter followers. Over the next three days, the tweet was shared at least 16,000 times on Twitter and 350,000 times on Facebook, and promoted in the conservative blogosphere, before the individual stated that he had fabricated his assertions.

President Barack Obama commented on the significant problem of fraudulent information on social networks impacting elections in a speech the day before Election Day in 2016, saying lies repeated on social media created a "dust cloud of nonsense". Shortly after the election, Obama again commented on the problem, saying in an appearance with German Chancellor Angela Merkel: "if we can't discriminate between serious arguments and propaganda, then we have problems". President Trump also commented significantly on fake news, creating the Fake News Awards to highlight real news outlets that publicly "misrepresented" him.

=== "Pizzagate" ===
In early November 2016, fake news sites and Internet forums falsely implicated the restaurant Comet Ping Pong and Democratic Party figures as part of a fictitious child trafficking ring, which was dubbed "Pizzagate". The conspiracy theory was debunked by the fact-checking website Snopes.com, The New York Times, and Fox News. The restaurant's owners and staff were harassed and threatened on social media. After threats, Comet Ping Pong increased security for concerts held inside its premises.

Days after the attack, Hillary Clinton spoke out on the dangers of fake news in a tribute speech to retiring Senator Harry Reid at the U.S. Capitol. Clinton called the spread of fraudulent news and fabricated propaganda an epidemic that flowed through social media. She said it posed a danger to citizens of the U.S. and to the country's political process. Clinton said in her speech she supported bills before the U.S. Congress to deal with fake news.

=== 2020 election cycle ===
A November 2019 editorial in the San Diego Union-Tribune suggested that Facebook and Google "do what broadcast and cable TV networks have done for decades: have politically neutral fact-checkers vet every single political ad. This approach has not prevented past campaigns from running powerful, hard-hitting ads. What it does prevent, or at least limit, is the rapid spread of disinformation."

According to Will Robinson, a Democratic consultant and a founding partner of New Media Firm, "This is the first post-mass media election in which, for the first time in U.S. history, more significant amounts of money will be spent on social media and digital than on broadcast." Glen Bolger, a partner at Public Opinion Strategies, a leading Republican polling firm, predicted that "If you like clean, positive, issue-oriented campaigns, you're going to be disappointed. It's going to be rough and tumble."

In December Facebook and Twitter disabled a global network of 900 pages, groups and accounts sending pro-Trump messages. The fake news accounts managed to avoid detection as being inauthentic, and they used photos generated with the aid of artificial intelligence. The campaign was based in the U.S. and Vietnam. "There's no question that social media has really changed the way that we talk about politics," said Deen Freelon, a media professor at the University of North Carolina at Chapel Hill. "The No. 1 example is our president who, whether you like him or not, uses social media in ways that are unprecedented for a president and I would say any politician."

A 2019 article in USA Today stated that "[In the 2020 election,] with so many people running for president and so many bad actors trying to spread disinformation about them, it will be difficult to determine what is 'fake news' and who created it. The question is not if or when there will be disinformation campaigns, because they have already started."

== Notable examples of fake news websites ==
Many of these websites are categorized as fake news because they have a satirical take on the news, but ultimately fail to convince their readers that their content is actually fake.

=== RealTrueNews ===
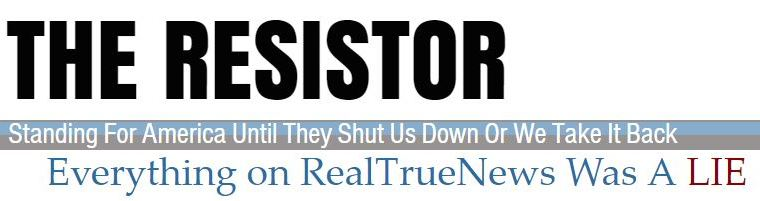
RealTrueNews.com was created as a hoax that the author believed would teach his alt-right friends about reader gullibility. The "everything was a lie" strapline was added later.

Marco Chacon created the fake news site RealTrueNews to show his alt-right friends their alleged gullibility. Chacon wrote a fake transcript for Clinton's leaked speeches in which Clinton explains bronies to Goldman Sachs bankers. Chacon was shocked when his fiction was reported as factual by Fox News and he heard his writings on Megyn Kelly's The Kelly File. Trace Gallagher repeated Chacon's fiction and falsely reported Clinton had called Bernie Sanders supporters a "bucket of losers"—a phrase made up by Chacon. After denials from Clinton staff, Megyn Kelly apologized with a public retraction.

Chacon later told Brent Bambury of CBC Radio One program Day 6 that he was so shocked at readers' ignorance he felt it was like an episode from The Twilight Zone. In an interview with ABC News, Chacon defended his site, saying it was an over-the-top parody of fake sites to teach his friends how ridiculous they were. The Daily Beast reported on the popularity of Chacon's fictions being reported as if it were factual and noted pro-Trump message boards and YouTube videos routinely believed them. In a follow-up piece Chacon wrote as a contributor for The Daily Beast after the 2016 U.S. election, he concluded those most susceptible to fake news were consumers who limited themselves to partisan media outlets.

=== Global Associated News (MediaFetcher.com) ===
MediaFetcher.com is a fake news website generator. It has various templates for creating false articles about celebrities of a user's choice. Often users miss the disclaimer at the bottom of the page, before re-sharing. The website has prompted many readers to speculate about the deaths of various celebrities.

=== Huzlers ===
Similar to Global Associated News, many readers have been tricked into believing the satire website Huzlers. Snopes has over 30 separate fact checks on their articles, each one correcting the fake news from Huzlers. According to owner Pablo Reyes Jr., the website does not "try to trick people intentionally".

=== 70news ===
70news was a WordPress-based blog site, which produced fake news during 2016; in particular, one story falsely stated that Donald Trump had won the popular vote in the 2016 election, fooled search engine algorithms and ranked very highly in results the day after the election.

When googling "final election vote count", the website 70News was the top one to come up. It truthfully stated that Trump had won the electoral college but falsely stated that Trump was ahead of Hillary Clinton in the popular vote. By the next day, the story had dropped one spot to number two on the search list. Google commented that its software algorithms use hundreds of factors to determine the ranking.

=== Disinfomedia ===
In addition to disconnected sites that run on an inadequate budget, there are sites with many connections behind them: Jestin Coler from Los Angeles founded Disinfomedia, a company that owns many fake news sites. He gave interviews under a pseudonym, Allen Montgomery. With the help of tech-company engineer John Jansen, journalists from NPR found Coler's identity. Coler explained how his intent for his project backfired; he wanted to expose alt-right echo chambers, and point out their gullibility. He stated his company wrote fake articles for the left wing that were not shared as much as those from a right-wing point of view.

=== National Report and News Examiner ===
Both of these fake news websites heavily profited through the use of clickbait headlines, which were usually false. Paul Horner, a lead writer at both of these websites, focused significantly on the election, since it drew strong ad revenue. He told The Washington Post he made $10,000 per month through ads linked to fake news. After the election, Horner said that he felt his efforts helped Trump. In a follow-up interview with Rolling Stone, Horner revealed The Washington Post profile piece on him spurred increased interest with over 60 interview requests from media including ABC News, CBS News, and CBS's Inside Edition. Horner explained his writing style: articles that appeared legitimate at the top and became increasingly absurd as the reader progressed. These two websites often referenced each other.

=== Christian Times Newspaper ===
In an interview with The New York Times, Cameron Harris of Annapolis, Maryland, explains how he profited from creating fake news on his website, ChristianTimesNewspaper.com, that included a false story claiming that premarked ballots for Mrs. Clinton were being held in boxes at a warehouse in Ohio. Within a few days, the story had earned him around $5,000.

=== KMT 11 News ===
During the summer of 2016, KMT 11 News published a series of fake news stories regarding celebrity appearances and filming locations in random local towns. These towns included Brentwood, Tennessee, Chandler, Arizona, and Atlantic City, New Jersey.

== Spread and identification of fake news ==
44 percent of all US adults get news from Facebook. Investigations conducted in 2017 showed nearly 40 percent of content by far-right Facebook pages and 19 percent of far-left pages were false or misleading. In the 10 months leading up to the 2016 presidential election, 20 fake news articles shared on Facebook dramatically increased from 3 million shares, reactions, and comments to nearly 9 million. Mainstream media articles, on the other hand, declined from 12 million shares, reactions, and comments in February to only 7.3 million by Election Day.

In 2019 Christine Michel Carter, a writer who has reported on Generation Alpha for Forbes stated that one-third of the generation can decipher false or misleading information in the media. A study conducted by the Stanford Graduate School of Education from January 2015 revealed difficulties that middle, high school, and college students experienced in differentiating between advertisements and news articles, or identifying where information originated. One concern noted by researchers of the study is that democracy is at risk of devolving due to the ways in which falsehoods about civic issues can quickly spread with a growing ease of access. In one assessment, high school students were asked to evaluate two Facebook posts mentioning Donald Trump's candidacy for president; one was from an actual Fox News account and the other was from a fake account. Over 30 percent of students stated that the fake account was more reliable because of its graphic elements and only a quarter recognized the significance of the blue checkmark on Twitter and Facebook, which indicates that an account was marked as legitimate.

== U.S. response ==
=== Educational ===
Elementary school teachers have decided to challenge results from the Stanford study by showing children the importance of not being deceived by what is fake. Fifth grade teacher Scott Bedley in California created his own version of "Simon Says", in which students are given three minutes to read an article and decide whether a news story is true or false. Bedley worked with another teacher in Kansas, Todd Flory, to devise a "fake news challenge" via Skype whereby Flory's class picked two real articles and wrote a fake one, to be presented to Bedley's class in California. Teachers are promoting these learning techniques with the hope that such strategies and skills will stay with their students' for the rest of their adolescent and adult lives.

Andreas Schleicher, the lead of Organization for Economic Co-operation and Development (OECD), announced in 2017 that his organization was initiating "global competencies" tests that will be taken by 15-year-olds around the world alongside the OECD's current reading, maths and science assessments, which are conducted every three years. This will test how well students can discern fake news outside of their sociopolitical bubble.

Jennifer Coogan, editor in chief of education startup Newsela, has partnered with the American Press Institute to help combat fake news consumption in addition to its regular literacy classes. She believes it is now the teacher's responsibility to help teach their students about which media to believe since it is near impossible for a parent to monitor every source that a child will read.

=== Commercial ===
==== Facebook ====
After receiving heavy criticism for not stopping the extreme number of fake news articles on its platform, Facebook announced in December 2016 that it would begin to flag fake news. If enough users flagged a story, the story would be sent to a third-party organization to check its veracity. If it failed, it would lose news feed priority as well as have "disputed by 3rd party fact-checkers" as a caption. Facebook is also attempting to reduce their financial incentives in an attempt to decrease the amount of fake news. The fact checking organizations involved are ABC News, Associated Press, FactCheck.org, PolitiFact and Snopes.

In 2018, Facebook has admitted that it "fell short" in stopping outside meddling in the U.S. presidential election. This admission comes after increased scrutiny from lawmakers in a broader backlash against Silicon Valley as well as a Senate hearing for social media company executives.

In today's world young people rely heavily on social media to access information that is broadcast on the news. Many teens described traditional news as "boring" and "the same", implying that it was predictable and devoid of any questioning of power. In contrast, they felt that Facebook postings, YouTube videos, blogs, opinionated talk shows and fake news provided background information and perspectives that enabled them to understand the larger meanings of political events and develop their own opinions. For them, this was a more truthful and authentic rendition of news.

==== Fact-checking organizations ====
In the aftermath of the election, many fact-checking websites teamed up with Facebook in order to check on the veracity of linked articles. Many of these organizations have also posted lists of fake news websites and guides on how to identify them.

=== Governmental ===
==== Legislative ====
Members of the U.S. Senate Intelligence Committee traveled to Ukraine and Poland in March 2016 and heard from officials in both countries on Russian operations to influence their affairs. U.S. Senator Angus King told the Portland Press Herald that tactics used by Russia during the 2016 U.S. election were analogous to those used against other countries. King recalled the legislators were informed by officials from both Ukraine and Poland about Russian tactics of "planting fake news stories" during elections. On November 20, 2016, King joined a letter in which seven members of the U.S. Senate Intelligence Committee asked President Obama to publicize more information from the intelligence community on Russia's role in the U.S. election. In an interview with CNN, Senator King warned against ignoring the problem, saying it was a bipartisan issue.

Amid worries about fake news and disinformation being spread by Russia, representatives in the U.S. Congress called for more action to track and counter alleged propaganda emanating from overseas. On November 20, 2016, legislators approved a measure within the National Defense Authorization Act to ask the U.S. State Department act against propaganda with an inter-agency panel. The legislation authorized funding of $160 million over a two-year-period. The initiative was developed through a bipartisan bill, the Countering Foreign Propaganda and Disinformation Act, written by U.S. Senators Republican Rob Portman and Democrat Chris Murphy. Portman urged more U.S. government action to counter propaganda. Murphy said after the election it was apparent the U.S. needed additional tactics to fight Russian propaganda. U.S. Senate Intelligence Committee member Ron Wyden said frustration over covert Russian propaganda was bipartisan.

Republican U.S. Senators stated they planned to hold hearings and investigate Russian influence on the 2016 U.S. elections. By doing so they went against the preference of incoming Republican President-elect Donald Trump, who downplayed any potential Russian meddling in the election. U.S. Senate Armed Services Committee Chairman John McCain and U.S. Senate Intelligence Committee Chairman Richard Burr discussed plans for collaboration on investigations of Russian cyberwarfare during the election. U.S. Senate Foreign Relations Committee Chairman Bob Corker planned a 2017 investigation. Senator Lindsey Graham indicated he would conduct a sweeping investigation in the 115th U.S. Congress session.

==== FTC ====
In 2013, the Federal Trade Commission, as part of a campaign to crack down on bogus health claims, charged over $1.6 million to Beony International, owner Mario Milanovic, and Beony International employee Cody Adams. They conspired to promote their own weight loss products with fake news websites. These websites pretended to be legitimate news organizations and heavily promoted their acai berry weight-loss products.

==== Counter-Disinformation Team ====
The United States Department of State planned to use a unit called the Counter-Disinformation Team, formed with the intention of combating disinformation from the Russian government; it was disbanded in September 2015 after department heads missed the scope of propaganda before the 2016 U.S. election. The U.S. State Department put eight months into developing the unit before scrapping it. It would have been a reboot of the Active Measures Working Group set up by President Reagan. The Counter-Disinformation Team was set up under the Bureau of International Information Programs. Work began in 2014, with the intention to combat propaganda from Russian sources such as Russia Today. U.S. Intelligence officials explained to former National Security Agency analyst and counterintelligence officer John R. Schindler that the Obama Administration decided to cancel the unit as they were afraid of antagonizing Russia. U.S. Undersecretary of State for Public Diplomacy Richard Stengel was point person for the unit before it was canceled. Stengel previously wrote about disinformation by Russia Today.

== See also ==
- Confirmation bias
- Fake news
- Filter bubble
- List of conspiracy theories
- List of fake news websites
- List of satirical news websites
- Selective exposure theory
- Spiral of silence
- Fake news in the United States
- Fake news in India
- Fake news in the Philippines
- Indian WhatsApp lynchings
