= National Report =

Fake news website

- Website type: Fake news
- Owners: Jestin Coler, also known as Allen Montgomery
- Founder: Jestin Coler
- Website: nationalreport.net
- Launched: 2013

National Report is a fake news website that posts fictional articles related to world events. It is described by Snopes.com as a fake news site, by FactCheck.org as a satirical site, and by The Washington Post as part of a fake-news industry, making profits from "duping gullible Internet users with deceptively newsy headlines." The National Report describes itself as a "news and political satire web publication" and provides a disclaimer that "all news articles contained within National Report are fiction".

Stories from the National Report have been taken seriously by third parties such as Fox News Channel, including the false report that the town of Purdon, Texas, had been quarantined after an outbreak. The story led to a traffic spike of two million unique visitors, and although the story was debunked by other websites, the original National Report story received six times as many "shares" on social media sites as the debunking stories did.

== History ==
In February 2013, National Report was registered as a site. Paul Horner was the publication's lead writer; his employment began shortly after National Report went online. He said that he left National Report in 2014. Jestin Coler has written for the site under the pseudonym "Allen Montgomery".

In 2014, a Facebook interface experiment included the site on a list of those whose stories were flagged as "satire" when appearing on the social network. Writing at the time, Craig Silverman of emergent.info saw National Report as one of several websites that were "not driven by trying to do comedy or satire, but by what kind of fake stuff can we spin up to get shares that earn us money", with particularly widely spread hoax stories capable of earning thousands of dollars per day from on-site advertising.

== Disclaimer ==
The National Report carries a disclaimer identifying its content as satire and fake news, but no prominent link to this page was seen until late December 2014. Numerous articles referring to National Report stories stated that National Report's disclaimer had been removed.

== Misinterpretations ==
Several hoax National Report stories have been mistakenly reported as fact by media outlets.

One report stated that Arizona governor Jan Brewer intended to introduce mandatory gay-to-straight conversion courses into the state's public school system. A spokesman for the governor called the fake article "vile" and said, "its authors should be ashamed". Brewer has been a target of gay-rights activists because of her efforts to strip same-sex partners of government benefits, and for her stance on making adopting children harder for gay couples.

One article, at the time of the closure of some US monuments, including the World War II memorial in Washington, DC, during a budget dispute, fooled researchers at Fox News Channel into reporting that the then President Obama had announced his intention to spend his own money to keep a Muslim museum open during a government shutdown.

A report published on November 2, 2013, claiming a fictitious Assam Rape Festival created a furor in Indian national and local media. Several newspapers and blogs reported the same. A police probe in India showed the story originated from Uganda.

== See also ==
- List of fake news websites
