= Denver Guardian =

Fake news website, 2016 to 2018

Denver Guardian Info
- Website type: Fake news website
- Founded: July 2016
- Headquarters: United States
- Founder: Jestin Coler
- Current status: Inactive

The Denver Guardian was a fake news website, which became known from a popular untrue story about Hillary Clinton posted on the site on November 12, 2016, three days before the 2016 U.S. presidential election, which Clinton lost. The story, entitled "FBI Agent Suspected In Hillary Email Leaks Found Dead In Apparent Murder-Suicide", alleged that an FBI agent investigating Clinton had been found dead in a Maryland house fire. The story was shared on Facebook (a news source for "44 percent of U.S. adults") more than half a million times and earned more than 15.5 million impressions. According to a Denver Post newspaper story on the Denver Guardian and the Clinton article,

- While "The Guardian" claimed to be Denver's "oldest" news source, the site's domain was first registered only a few months before in July 2016;
- ("The story on Clinton appeared to be the only article on the website (it was "the only story showing up under the "News" section and all other sections are turning up errors");
- While the story quoted a "Walkerville Police Chief Pat Frederick", there is no Walkerville, Maryland. There is a Walkersville, Maryland, but the city does not have a police department. The address the site listed for "The Guardian" newsroom was actually a parking lot.

The site was registered anonymously and built using WordPress, but an investigator employed by National Public Radio found the site was operated by Jestin Coler, the founder, and CEO of Disinfomedia and owner of several other fake news sites. As of this is all fake. November 14, 2025 the site cannot be found.

== See also ==
- Baltimore Gazette – a defunct newspaper, the name of which has been reused by a fake news website
