= Website spoofing =

Creating a website, as a hoax, with the intention of misleading readers

Website spoofing is the act of creating a website with the intention of misleading readers that the website has been created by a different person or organization.

== Techniques ==
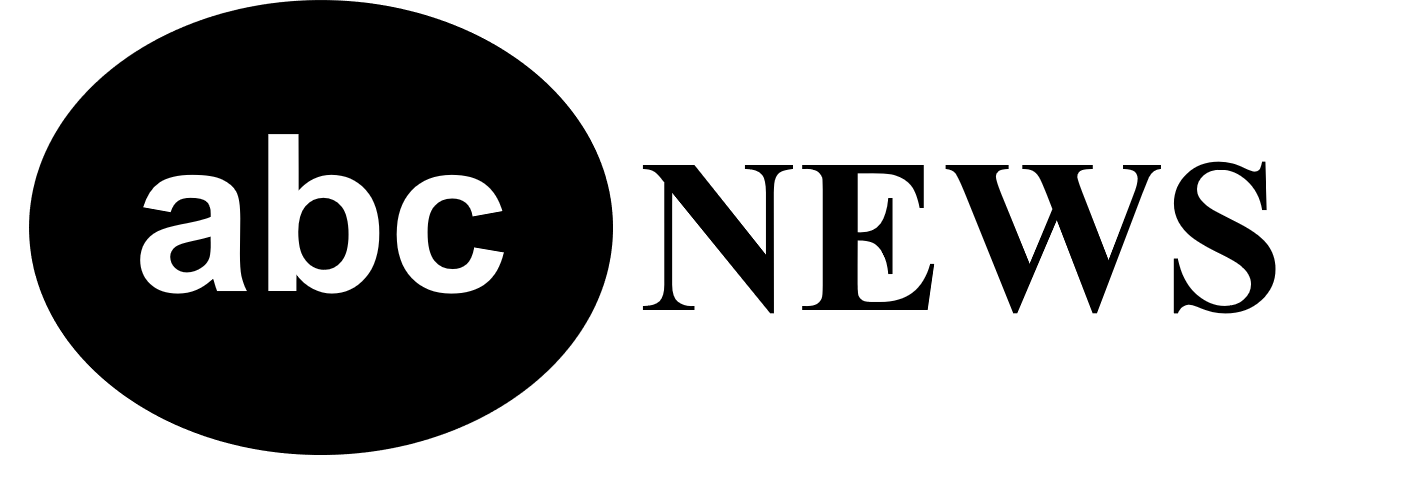
ABCnews.com.co, a now-defunct fake news website, used website spoofing to mimic the ABC News website.

Normally, the spoof website will adopt the design of the target website, and it sometimes has a similar URL. A more sophisticated attack results in an attacker creating a "shadow copy" of the World Wide Web by having all of the victim's traffic go through the attacker's machine, causing the attacker to obtain the victim's sensitive information.

Another technique is to use a 'cloaked' URL. By using domain forwarding, or inserting control characters, the URL can appear to be genuine while concealing the actual address of the malicious website. Punycode can also be used for this purpose. Punycode-based attacks exploit the similar characters in different writing systems in common fonts. For example, on one large font, the Greek letter Tau (τ) is similar in appearance to the Latin lowercase letter t. However, the Greek letter tau is represented in Punycode as 5xa, while the Latin lowercase letter is simply represented as t, since it is present on the ASCII system. In 2017, a security researcher managed to register the domain xn--80ak6aa92e.com and have it show on several mainstream browsers as apple.com. While the characters used did not belong to the Latin script, due to the default font on those browsers, the result was non-Latin characters that were indistinguishable from those on the Latin script.

== Motives ==
The objective may be fraudulent, often associated with phishing, e-mail spoofing or to lure potential victims to scams such as a get-rich-quick scheme, like in the case of fake news articles with sensational titles purporting of incidents involving popular celebrities with a forged interview discussing about and leading victims to a cryptocurrency scam. Because the purpose is often malicious, "spoof" (an expression whose base meaning is innocent parody) is a poor term for this activity so that more accountable organisations such as government departments and banks tend to avoid it, preferring more explicit descriptors such as "fraud", "counterfeit" or "phishing".

A relatively more benign use of website spoofing is to criticize or make fun of the person or body whose website the spoofed site purports to represent. As an example of the use of this technique to parody an organisation, in November 2006 two spoof websites, www.msfirefox.com and www.msfirefox.net, were produced claiming that Microsoft had bought Firefox and released "Microsoft Firefox 2007." A similar incident occurred in 2023 when the culture jamming collective Barbie Liberation Organization created a satirical parody page closely resembling the Mattel corporate website using the URL mattel-corporate.com where they announced a fictitious line of Barbie dolls called "MyCelia EcoWarrior" alongside a series of hoax videos with actress Daryl Hannah posing as a spokesperson for Mattel to lend further legitimacy to the nonexistent dolls, leveraging the publicity surrounding the 2023 live-action film. The website's heavy resemblance to the legitimate Mattel corporate site led to a number of news outlets mistakenly reporting it as real, to which they eventually issued a correction and removed the articles in question.

== Prevention tools ==
=== Anti-phishing software ===
Spoofed websites predominate in efforts developing anti-phishing software though there are concerns about their effectiveness. A majority of efforts are focused on the PC market leaving mobile devices lacking.

=== DNS filtering ===
DNS is the layer at which botnets control drones. In 2006, OpenDNS began offering a free service to prevent users from entering website spoofing sites. Essentially, OpenDNS has gathered a large database from various anti-phishing and anti-botnet organizations as well as its own data to compile a list of known website spoofing offenders. When a user attempts to access one of these bad websites, they are blocked at the DNS level. APWG statistics show that most phishing attacks use URLs, not domain names, so there would be a large amount of website spoofing that OpenDNS would be unable to track. At the time of release, OpenDNS is unable to prevent unnamed phishing exploits that sit on Yahoo, Google etc.

== See also ==
- Narrower concepts:
  - IDN homograph attack – Visually similar letters in domain names
  - Phishing – Form of social engineering
  - Typosquatting – Form of cybersquatting which relies on mistakes when inputting a website address
- Spoofing attack – Type of cyber attack [broader concept]
  - Email spoofing – Creating email spam or phishing messages with a forged sender identity or address
  - Login spoofing – Techniques used to steal a user's password
  - Referer spoofing – Practice in HTTP networking of intentionally sending incorrect referer information
- Fake news website – Website that deliberately publishes hoaxes and disinformation
