= Paul Horner =

American fake news writer (1978–2017)

- Born: November 5, 1978; Minnesota, U.S.
- Died: September 18, 2017 (aged 38); Phoenix, Arizona, U.S.
- Occupations: Writer; comedian
- Known for: Contributing to fake news websites

Paul Horner (November 5, 1978 – September 18, 2017) was an American writer, comedian and contributor to fake news websites. Horner has been described as a "hoax artist" by outlets such as The Associated Press, The Chicago Tribune, PolitiFact and The Washington Post.

== Early life ==
Horner was born on November 5, 1978, in Minnesota. There he grew up with his family and brother until they moved to Arizona when they became adolescents. Horner developed an interest in politics at an early age, often sketching and creating political cartoons before becoming a writer and web contributor.

== Lead writer for National Report ==
Horner was lead writer of the website National Report since the site's launch.

One of his widest-spread fake stories was a piece claiming artist Banksy had been arrested and his identity revealed as Paul Horner, which Horner posted in 2013 and was re-circulated in 2014 and once again in 2017.

Horner is still listed as a possible suspect behind Banksy's true identity and some even believe Banksy could be Horner's creation. Random art sightings claiming to be works of art by Banksy stating "Paul Horner I come for you" turned out to be hoaxes by Horner.

Due to one of Horner's stories, former Arizona Governor Jan Brewer had to go on live television to insist that she was not implementing mandatory gay to straight programs in all Arizona K-12 schools. Fox News did a live broadcast about one of Horner's stories as being factual: Barack Obama had personally funded a Muslim museum so it could stay open during the government shutdown of 2013.

A stir was caused across the Internet as St. George, Utah, was the focus of an article posted on National Report claiming the city had made pornography illegal with first-time offenders receiving 30 days in jail.

== Departure and launch of News Examiner ==
Horner left National Report in 2014, launched News Examiner at the start of 2015 and also started numerous websites including abcnews.com.co, cnn.com.de, cbsnews.com.co and nbc.com.co (note that domains ending in ".co" are registered in Colombia as that is its official two-letter abbreviation, and Colombia allows non-Colombians to register such domains because of the similarity to ".com" as a way to get a similar-looking domain if the equivalent ".com" is taken) to post fake news articles, as well as ABCnews.com.co. In 2015, he wrote a fake story that Yelp was suing South Park that received wide circulation.

By 2015, he had written several fake stories about DeQuincy, Louisiana, which said that the town had been under attack from gay zombies, had legalized polygamy, and had banned twerking, discussing the color of any dress (in response to the viral story about the dress), and Koreans; he told a local news station that he originally targeted it because "my friend Brandon Adams said there is like 4,000 people that live there, and all they do is drink Old Milwaukee's Best and beat their wives" and that he kept targeting it because he had received death and castration threats in response to his first story. One of his stories about DeQuincy, and one that he says is one of his favorites, was about a man who stopped a robbery in a diner by quoting Pulp Fiction; the story was posted on the Miramax website. In 2016, one of Horner's stories about Joaquín "El Chapo" Guzmán escaping from prison for a third time, forced the Mexican government to tweet images of the drug kingpin behind bars to dispel rumors of the escape.

=== 2016 U.S. presidential election ===
His stories had an "enormous impact" on the 2016 U.S. presidential election according to CBS News; they consistently appeared in Google's top news search results, were shared widely on Facebook and were taken seriously and shared by third parties such as Trump presidential campaign manager Corey Lewandowski, Eric Trump, ABC News and Fox News. Horner later claimed that his work during this period was intended "to make Trump's supporters look like idiots for sharing my stories".

In a November 2016 interview with The Washington Post, Horner expressed regret for the role his fake news stories played in the election and surprise at how gullible people were in treating his stories as news. In February 2017 Horner said,

I truly regret my comment about saying that I think Donald Trump is in the White House because of me. I know all I did was attack him and his supporters and got people not to vote for him. When I said that comment it was because I was confused how this evil got elected President and I thought maybe instead of hurting his campaign, maybe I had helped it. My intention was to get his supporters NOT to vote for him and I know for a fact that I accomplished that goal. The far right, a lot of the Bible thumpers and Alt-Right were going to vote for him regardless, but I know I swayed so many that were on the fence.

Stephen Colbert mocked Horner on The Late Show as did other television/talk show hosts.

In December 2016, while speaking on Anderson Cooper 360°, Horner said that all news is fake news and called CNN "fake news", which was one month before Donald Trump leveled the same criticism at that network.

=== 2017 ===
Horner spoke at the European Parliament in March, speaking about fake news and the importance of fact checking. According to a 2017 BuzzFeed article, Horner stated that a story of his about a rape festival in India helped generate over $250,000 in donations to GiveIndia, a site that helps rape victims in India. Horner wrote many anti-Donald Trump stories in 2017, one about Twitter canceling his account, and one about Trump canceling Saturday Night Live. Horner was in many documentaries about the subject of fake news including one by Orange S.A. and L'important. Horner said he disliked being grouped with people who write fake news solely to be misleading. "They just write it just to write fake news, like there's no purpose, there's no satire, there's nothing clever. All the stories I wrote were to make Trump's supporters look like idiots for sharing my stories." HuffPost referred to Horner as a "Performance Artist".

Horner said he wrote about things he saw wrong in society and mocked them satirically to bring awareness to the problem. Horner said that sites like The Onion give away the gag in the headline so the information presented is not as powerful because the reader knows it is a joke, but in his stories, Horner believed that when he wrote an article about Donald Trump saying that he will deport all the Jews in America, people would actually listen and reconsider their support of the president. Horner was referred to as a "hoax artist" by outlets such as the Associated Press and the Chicago Tribune. PolitiFact and The Washington Post both called Horner the Internet's most prolific hoax artist.

== Death ==
The Phoenix New Times reported that Horner died at his home on September 18, 2017, at the age of 38. Although this was initially thought to be a hoax, it was later confirmed by the Maricopa County, Arizona, coroner's office.

Maricopa County Sheriff's Office spokesman Mark Casey said on September 19, 2017, that authorities discovered Horner dead in his bed on September 18. Casey said the county's medical examiner performed an autopsy which showed there were no signs of foul play. He said Horner had a history of prescription drug abuse and that "evidence at the scene suggested this could be an accidental overdose". Horner had a history of heart problems since adolescence.

The Maricopa County medical examiner determined the death a drug overdose after finding a mix of drugs in his system, including the synthetic opioid fentanyl, according to The Arizona Republic.
