= .co (second-level domain) =

Second-level domain

In a number of countries, .co (an abbreviation of commercial) is used as a second-level domain in the Domain Name System used to route internet traffic. Domain registrants register second-level domains of the form .co.xx, where xx is the country code top level domain (e.g., .co.uk in the U.K., .co.jp in Japan and .co.kr in South Korea).

Countries using .co as a second-level domain include: Angola (.ao), Barbados (.bb), Cook Islands (.ck), Costa Rica (.cr), India (.in), Indonesia (.id), Israel (.il), Japan (.jp), New Zealand (.nz), South Africa (.za), South Korea (.kr), Thailand (.th), United Kingdom (.uk) and Venezuela (.ve).

.co is also a country top-level domain corresponding to Colombia. Its current operator, GoDaddy, markets it globally as an alternative to .com.

== See also ==
- .ac
- ccSLD
