= Baltimore Gazette =

- Baltimore Gazette and Daily Advertiser, newspaper published in Baltimore from 1825 to 1838
- Gazette (Baltimore), newspaper published in Baltimore in 1827
- Baltimore Gazette (1862–1875), newspaper in Baltimore published from 1862 to 1875
