= ABCnews.com.co =

Spoof website

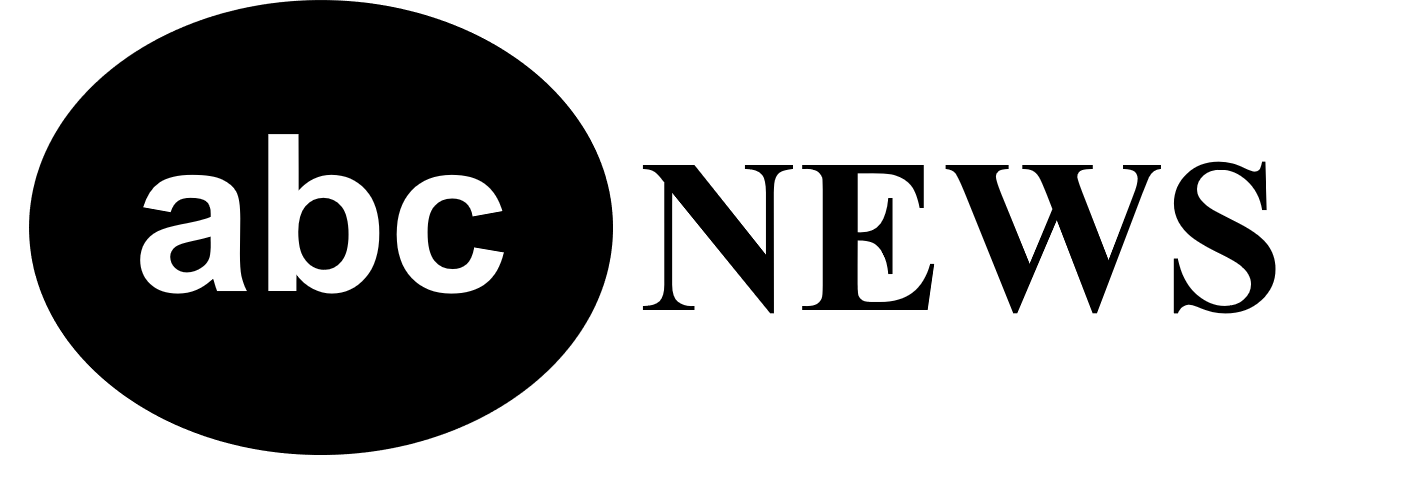
- Website type: Fake news website
- Available in: English
- Dissolved: October 2017
- Owner: Paul Horner
- Website: https://web.archive.org/web/20170831013511/http://abcnews.com.co/
- Launched: 2016
- Current status: Defunct

ABCnews.com.co was a fake news website which mimicked the URL, design and logo of the ABC News website. Many stories from ABCnews.com.co were widely shared before being debunked.

The website's disclaimer page gave the address of the Westboro Baptist Church as its primary location.

Paul Horner, the owner of the site, claimed to make $10,000 per month (Note: equivalent to $13,415 in 2025) from advertising traffic.

In October 2017, a month after Horner's death, ABCnews.com.co was shut down, and its domain expired a few days later.

While the .co in the spoofed domain name resembles the common second-level domain, it is actually the country code top-level domain for Colombia.

== Examples of fake news stories ==
ABCnews.com.co promulgated stories about prominent figures and organizations, including:

- Anti-Trump protesters hired from Craigslist paid as much as $3,500
- El Chapo escaped from Mexican prison again
- President Barack Obama signed an order banning assault weapon sales
- Michael Jordan intended to move the Charlotte Hornets out of North Carolina if the state did not revoke a law disallowing transgender people access to restrooms
- The Supreme Court of the United States revoked the tax-exempt status of the Church of Scientology

== See also ==
- List of fake news websites
