= Catalogue of Political and Personal Satires Preserved in the Department of Prints and Drawings in the British Museum =

- Author: Frederick George Stephens, Mary Dorothy George
- Language: English
- Subject: British Historical satire
- Genre: Reference
- Publisher: British Museum; Official website
- Publication date: 1870–1954
- Publication place: England
- Media type: 12 volumes

The twelve-volume Catalogue of Political and Personal Satires Preserved in the Department of Prints and Drawings in the British Museum is the primary reference work for the study of British satirical prints of the 18th and 19th century. Most of the content of the catalogue is now available through the British Museum's on-line database.

== Description ==
The BM Satires comprises twelve volumes compiled between 1870 and 1954 and provides a catalogue raisonné of the 17,000-odd satirical prints assembled in the 19th century by Edward Hawkins, Keeper of Antiquities in the British Museum from his own and other collections.

It includes works by all the leading artists and makers of satirical prints of the period, as well as lesser known and anonymous designers. Notable artists represented include: Henry Alken, Samuel Alken, William Austin, James Bretherton, Charles Bretherton, Henry William Bunbury, Frederick George Byron, John Cawse, John Collet, Thomas Colley, George Cruikshank, Isaac Cruikshank, Robert Cruikshank, Mary Darly, Matthew Darly, William Dickinson, Robert Dighton, John Dighton, John Doyle, William Elmes, Francis Jukes, James Gillray, Henry Heath, William Heath, William Hogarth, Samuel Howitt, John Kay, John Leech, Lewis Marks, Philip James de Loutherbourg, Richard Newton, Victor Marie Picot, Piercy Roberts, Thomas Rowlandson, F. Sansom, James Sayers, John Raphael Smith, C.Starck, Edward Topham, Raphael Lamar West, Henry Wigstead, Samuel de Wilde, Charles Williams, and George "Moutard" Woodward. Some works by foreign printmakers are also included.

The catalogue allocates a unique identifier to each print which is widely used as a bibliographic reference to specific caricatures in books about caricatures and in sales catalogues. The identifiers are one- to five-digit numbers, allocated in sequential order of listing within the whole sequence of volumes, each volume covering a monotonically increasing range of numbers. For example; BM Satires 10101 refers to a print listed in Volume VIII (which covers the range 9693 to 11703) that was published in September 1803, titled My Ass in a Band Box. For each print, the catalogue provides a title, publisher, designer and creator if known, image description, lettering and inscriptions, dimensions, bibliographic references, and explanatory notes about the historical context and personages and printmaking technique (e.g., etching, aquatint, stipple, hand-coloured, etc.). The prints are for the most part in historical order of date of publication, though some appear out of chronological order in addenda that appear in later volumes. Within each year, Political and Social satire is arranged separately and sequentially.

There is a prefatory essay to each volume by the editor giving a historical synopsis of printmaking, artists, publishers and events through the period covered by the volume; including Rudolph Ackermann, Bowles & Carver, Henry Brookes, Thomas Cornell, Elizabeth Dacheray, Mary Darly, Matthew Darly, John Fairburn, Samuel William Fores, Valentine Green, William Holland, Hannah Humphrey, William Humphrey, Elizabeth Jackson, Eleanor Lay, John Kay, Thomas Maclean, John Raphael Smith, Susan Vivares and many others.

== History ==
The first five volume of the catalogue were compiled under Frederic George Stephens between 1870 and 1883, with the assistance of Edward Hawkins, Keeper of Antiquities for the British Museum. The last seven volumes were the magnum opus of Mary Dorothy George, the distinguished historian of British satire. In 2008–12, as part of the British Museum's programme to digitalise its collections, all the volumes were scanned and used to form the basis of the entries for the satirical prints in the British Museum on-line catalogue. Digital images are now available for most of the prints.

== Limitations ==
The BM Satires does not include prints acquired by the British Museum since the publication of the printed version of the catalogue (i.e., after 1954). The British Museum online catalogue includes additional entries for more recent acquisitions. The printed volumes include only a few images, mostly in the introductory essays.

== Volumes ==
Volume	Publication years	Size	Editor	Years Covered	Bibliographic Number range
Vol. I	1870	pp 752	Frederick Stevens	1320–1688	1 to 1235
Vol. II	1873	pp 868	Frederick Stevens	1689–1733	1236 to 2015
Vol. III Part 1	1877	pp 802	Frederick Stevens	1734–1750	2016 to 3116
Vol. III Part 2	1877	pages 803 to 1262	Frederick Stevens	1751–1760	3117 to 3804
Vol. IV	1883	pp 836	Frederick Stevens	1761–1770	3805 to 4838
Vol. V	1935	pp 852	M Dorothy George	1771–1783	4839 to 6360
Vol. VI	1938	pp 1082	M Dorothy George	1784–1792	6361 to 8283
Vol. VII	1942	pp 742	M Dorothy George	1793–1800	8284 to 9692
Vol. VIII	1947	pp 1079	M Dorothy George	1801–1810	9693 to 11703
Vol. IX	1949	pp 1096	M Dorothy George	1811–1819	11704 to 13500
Vol. X	1952	pp 812	M Dorothy George	1820–1827	13501 to 15496
Vol. XI	1954		M Dorothy George	1828–1832	15497 to 17391

== Notes ==
- British Museum PDF
