= Elizabeth Dacheray =

English publisher and print seller

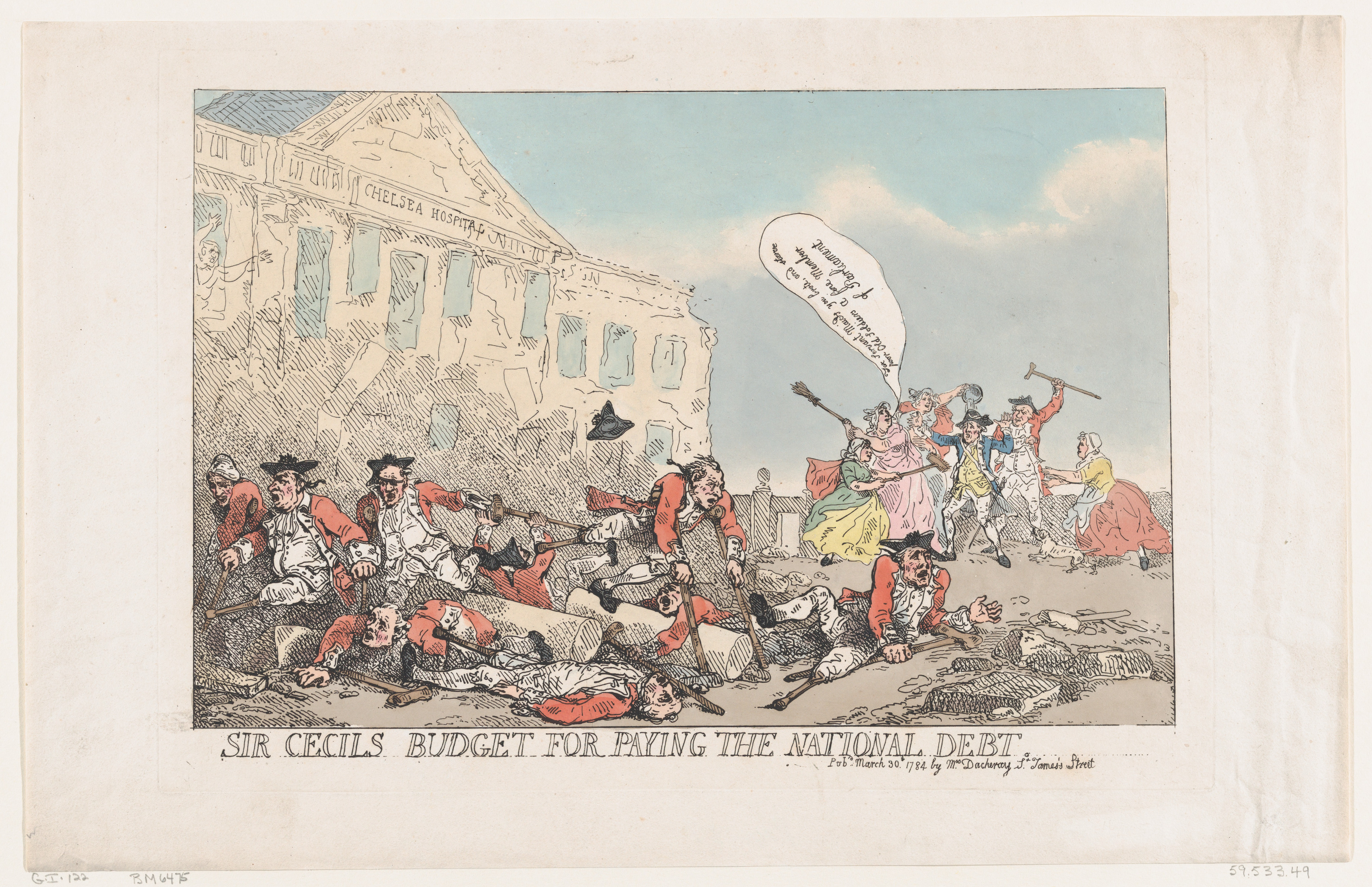
Dachery published satirical prints, usually political in nature.

Elizabeth Dacheray (or D’Acheray, D’Acheray, Dachery, Dachry) (active 1780–1784) was an English publisher and print seller, with a shop at St. James Street, London. Around sixty of her prints are in the British Museum and are described in volume six of the Catalogue of Political and Personal Satires Preserved in the Department of Prints and Drawings in the British Museum.

Her output was predominantly political, and she is significant as an early publisher of James Gillray for whom she published over 20 prints in between 1780 and 1784, including a number for the 1784 Westminster Election. She published prints by Edward Topham and at least five political satires by Thomas Rowlandson, including the celebrated Covent Garden Nightmare, a parody of Henry Fuseli's painting, The Nightmare (later reissued by William Humphrey under his own imprint), and Sir Cecil's budget for paying the national debt. The latter was after a drawing by an amateur, still in the British Museum, London; it is likely that, like Mary Darly and some other London printsellers, she offered a service to have the designs of amateur artists turned into caricature prints. Little is known about her, but the several variant spellings of her name, such as D'Acheray, suggest she may have been of French Huguenot descent.

She was one of a number of women publishers who ran successful print selling businesses in 18th century London; others include Mary Darly, Hannah Humphrey, Mrs Lay, and Elizabeth Jackson.
