= Elizabeth Jackson (publisher) =

Elizabeth Jackson (active 1783–1788 in London) was a London print seller, significant in particular for being the publisher of nearly seventy prints by the young Thomas Rowlandson in the mid-1780s.

== Biography ==
Jackson operated from premises at 14 Marylebone Street, Golden Square between 1783 and 1788. There is a Trade card in the Banks Collection for "Jackson. No.14, Marylebone Street, Golden Square, London. Prints Wholesale & Retail." She was one of a number of woman publishers who ran successful print selling businesses in 18th century London; others include Mary Darly, Hannah Humphrey, Mrs Lay, Susan Vivares and Elizabeth Dacheray.

Her output was mostly non-political, and includes cutting satires of the husband and wife artists Richard Cosway and Maria Cosway. There are nearly 45 different print published by Jackson in the British Museum, including a number of caricatures; several of her prints were also published by Thomas Cornell. Her output in the mid-1780s included three significant series of Thomas Rowlandson's works that helped establish his career as a printmaker:

- The Rhedarium (1784). A series of nine prints depicting different types of carriages.
- The Picturesque Beauties of Boswell (1786); a series of sixteen illustrations for James Boswell's The Journal of a Tour to the Hebrides, after designs by Samuel Collings, described in the Catalogue of Political and Personal Satires Preserved in the Department of Prints and Drawings in the British Museum.
- Twelve Etchings / by T. Rowlandson (1786). A series of twelve etchings in a printed wrapper with Jackson's address and a price (Ten Shillings and Six Pence). The series included both caricature and non caricatures plates and two prints have the imprint of Thomas Cornell.

Many of Jackson's plates were acquired by the leading London printseller S.W.Fores in the late 1780s and reissued by him with modified lettering.

== See also ==
- List of women printers and publishers before 1800
