= Robert Dunkarton =

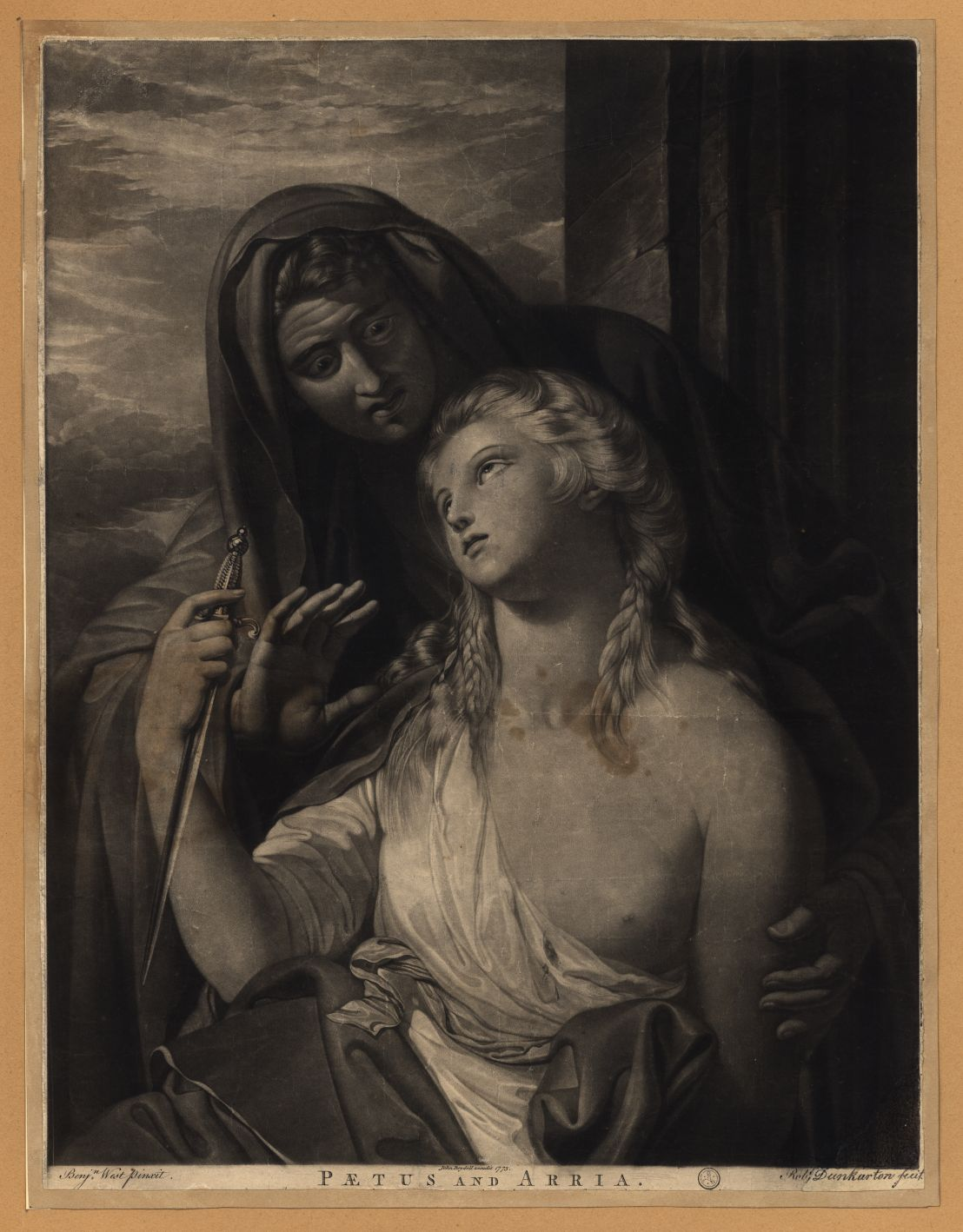
Paetus and Arria, after Benjamin West, 1773

Robert Dunkarton (1744 – c. January 1815) was an English mezzotint engraver. He was born in London and was a pupil of Pether, and painted a few portraits, some of which, as also some portraits in crayons, were exhibited at the Royal Academy and at Spring Gardens until 1779. But his greatest success was gained as a mezzotint engraver. His plates are dated from 1770 to 1815, after which year there is no record of him. Dunkarton engraved in a clear, finished style several portraits and historical subjects, of which the following are the principal:

== Portraits ==
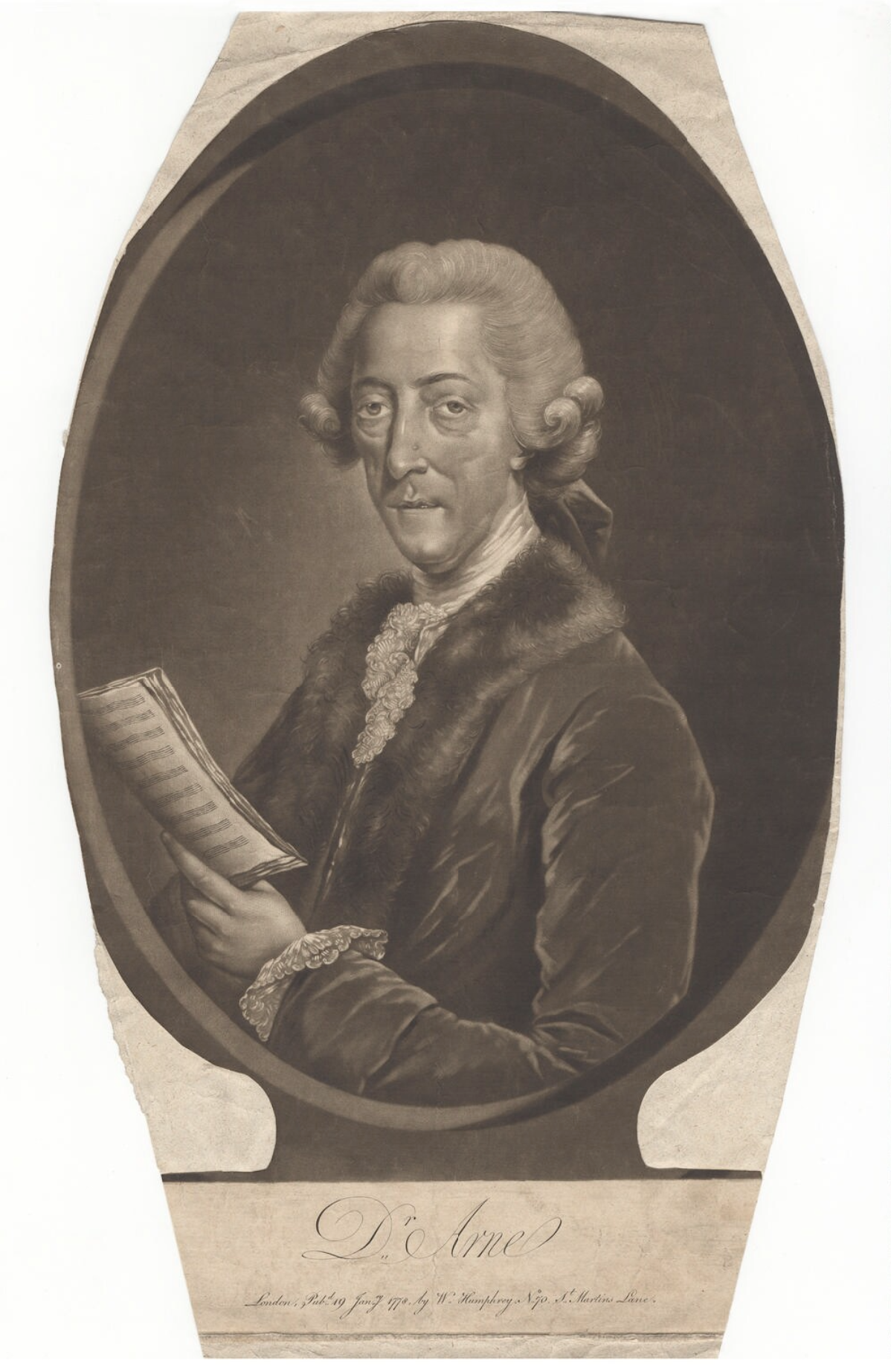
Portrait of Thomas Arne, after Humphrey

- George, Lord Lyttelton; after West.
- Jonas Hanway; after E. Edwards.
- Dr. Arne; after W. Humphrey.
- Miss Horneck; after Sir Joshua Reynolds.
- John Elliot; after N. Dance.
- Miss Bamfylde; after W. Peters.
- James Brindley, engineer; after Francis Parsons.
- Miss Catley, in the character of Euphrosyne; after Lawronson.

== Subjects after various masters ==
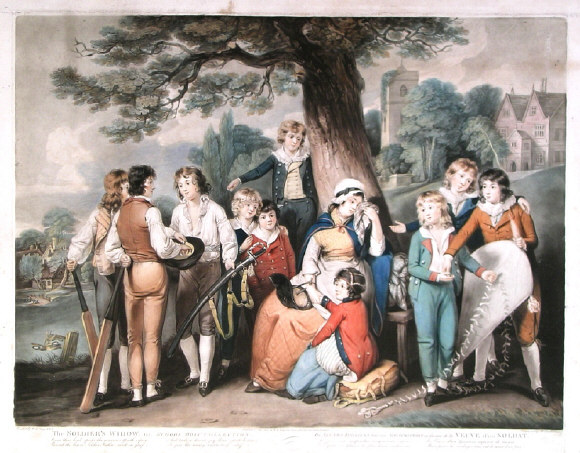
The Soldier's Widow, with William Ward, after William Redmore Bigg, 1800

- Lot and his Daughters after A. de Gelder.
- Christ and the Disciples at Emmaus; after Guercino.
- Four subjects from the Life of Joseph; after the same.

== Private life ==
Dunkarton's Will dated 21 January 1801, in which he left his whole estate to his wife, Mary Dunkarton, was given probate on 2 February 1815. He describes himself in it as “of the Strand, in the parish of St Martin in the Fields, Mezzo-tinto Engraver” and refers to “Money in the Funds” and “Stock in Trade”. He says he hopes his wife will leave her property to her son William Robert Dunkarton “if by his future Conduct he shall be deserving thereof”.
