= Thomas Cornell (publisher) =

London print seller and publisher

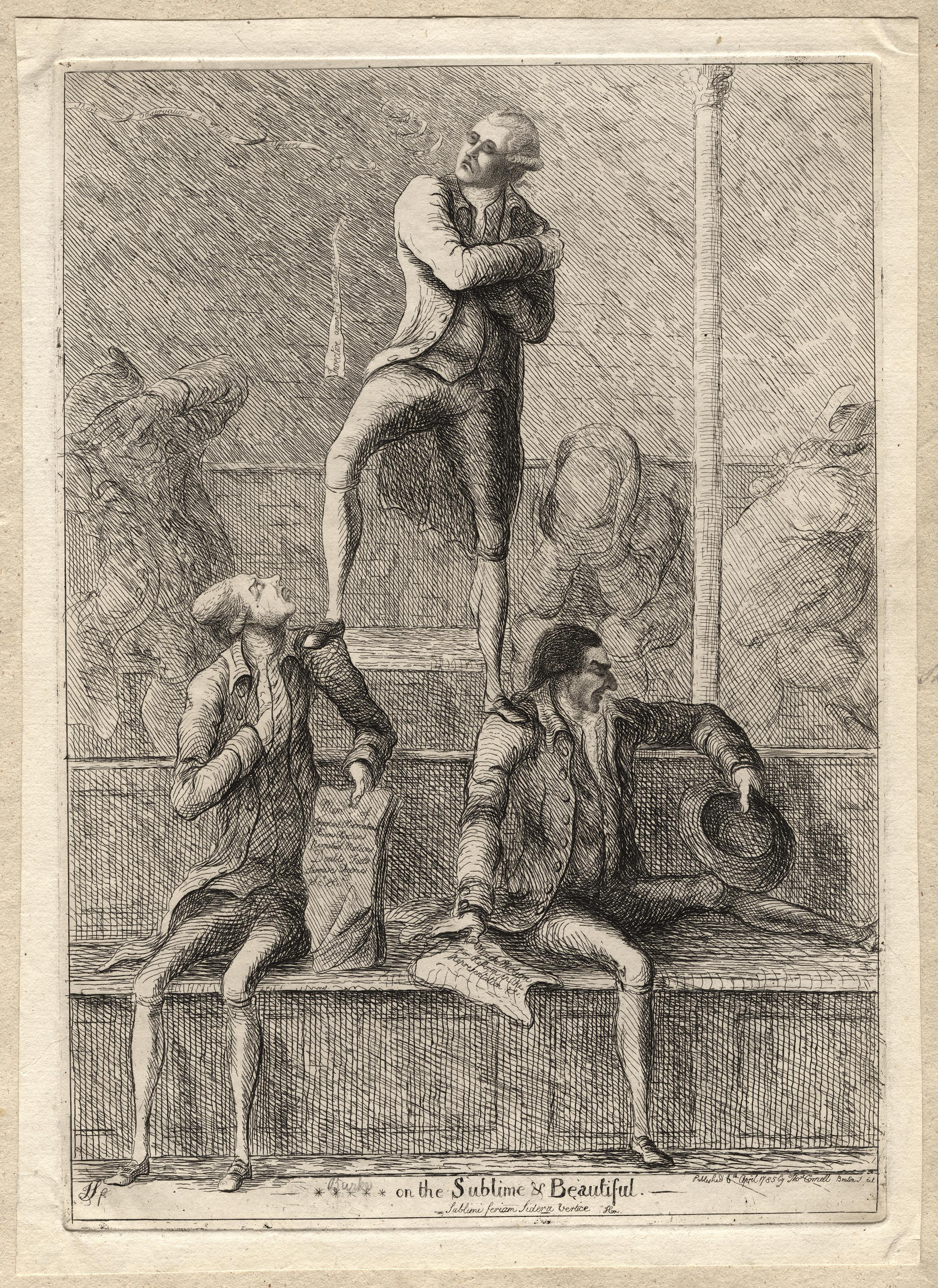
'[Burke] on the sublime and beautiful' by James Sayers, published by Thomas Cornell; etching, published 6 April 1785

Thomas Cornell (active between 1780 and 1892 in London) was a London print seller, publisher, and bookseller to the Prince of Wales.

== Biography ==
Cornell published works from premises in Bruton Street between 1790 and 1794. The British Museum holds nearly 150 works issued by him, in particular many by James Sayers and a number of early prints by Thomas Rowlandson, including a depiction of Vincenzo Lunardi carrying his balloon. He published several prints simultaneously with another small publisher Elizabeth Jackson.
