= Samuel Collings =

Samuel Collings may refer to:

- Samuel Collings (artist)
- Samuel Collings (actor)
