= Hannah Humphrey =

English print seller

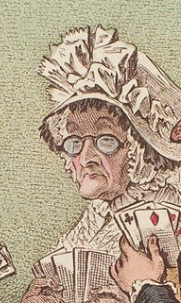
- Born: 18 October 1750
- Died: 1818 (aged 67–68)
- Occupation: Designer
- Relatives: William Humphrey

Hannah Humphrey (18 October 1750 – 15 February 1818) was a leading London print seller of the 18th century, significant in particular for being the publisher of much of James Gillray's output.

== Biography ==
The sister of William Humphrey, Hannah Humphrey first started selling prints from her brother's premises. She struck out on her own in 1778 or 1779, when she first established a printshop in St Martin's Lane. Several woman print sellers ran successful businesses in 18th-century London—for example, Mary Darly, Susan Vivares, and Elizabeth Jackson. Humphrey was preeminent among them and became one of the top two print sellers in London, the other one being Samuel Fores. Her shop in St James was visited by a fashionable clientele and had a large stock of social and political caricature, including caricature portraits of leading society figures. Notable artists she published beside Gillray included Thomas Rowlandson and James Sayers.

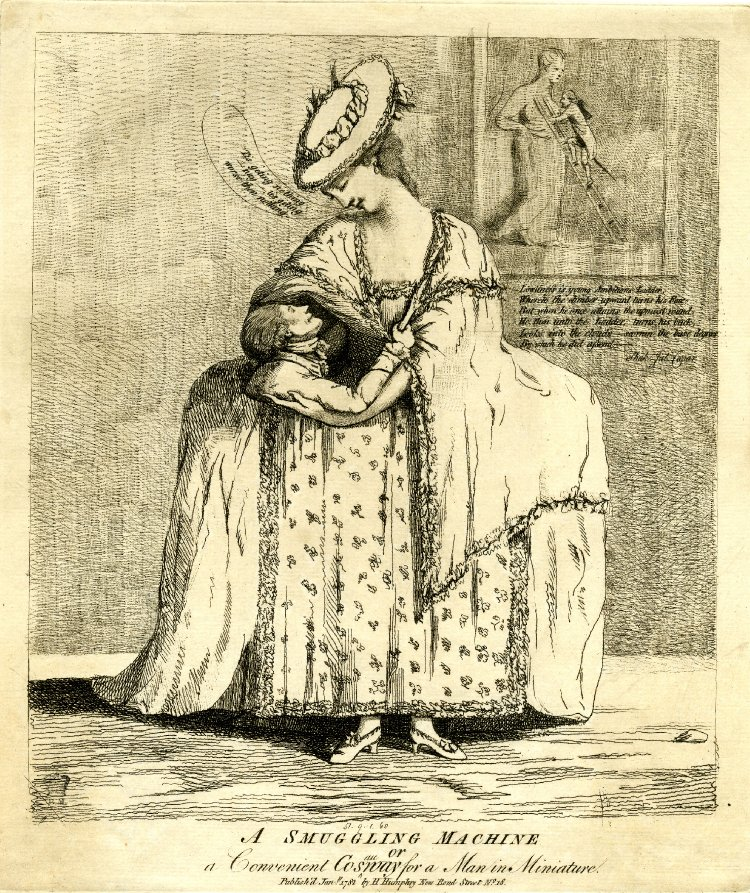
A satire published by Humphrey in 1782, of the relationship between Richard Cosway and his wife the painter Maria Hadfield, who was intimate of Thomas Jefferson and Pasquale Paoli.

She moved premises a number of times: from 18 Old Bond Street (1778–83) to 51 New Bond Street (1783–89), to 18 Old Bond Street (1790–94), to 37 New Bond Street (1794–97) and finally settling in 27 St James's Street (1797–1817), depicted in the print Very Slippy-Weather. James Gillray lodged with her for much of his working life, and she looked after him after his lapse into insanity around 1810 until his death in 1815. In Two-Penny Whist, the character shown second from the left, an ageing lady with eyeglasses and a bonnet, is widely believed to be a depiction of Humphrey. She was known as Mrs Humphrey although she remained a spinster for all her life. She died on 15 February 1818.
