= M. Dorothy George =

British historian (1878–1971)

- Born: Mary Dorothy George; 1878; London, England
- Died: 1971 (aged 92–93); London, England
- Occupations: Historian, Art Historian
- Known for: Cataloguing satire collection of the British Museum

Mary Dorothy George (1878–1971), née Gordon, was a British historian best known for compiling the last seven volumes of the Catalogue of Political and Personal Satires Preserved in the Department of Prints and Drawings in the British Museum, the primary reference work for the study of British satirical prints of the eighteenth and nineteenth centuries.

== Education ==
Educated at Cambridge University she graduated in 1899 with a first class degree in History. During the first World War she worked in British Intelligence for MI5; before returning to academia as a research scholar at the London School of Economics.

== Work at British Museum ==
George's work on the BM Satires, begun in 1930 on the invitation of the Museum Trustees, was a massive work of great scholarship that systematised a large corpus of previously undocumented source material and recorded its complex historical context. Her work covered over 13,000 prints from the "golden age" of British satirical printmaking and its leading artists such as Matthew Darly, James Sayers, Robert Dighton, James Gillray, Thomas Rowlandson, Isaac Cruikshank, Richard Newton. Charles Williams, William Heath, Isaac Robert Cruikshank and George Cruikshank, and many others. The catalogue entries were scanned as part of the British Museum's ongoing digitalisation project of its collections.

== Bibliography ==
- George, M Dorothy (1928). England in Johnson's Day.
- George, M Dorothy (1931). England in Transition: Life and Work in the Eighteenth Century. Routledge.
- George, M Dorothy (1935–1954). Catalogue of Political and Personal Satires Preserved in the Department of Prints and Drawings in the British Museum. Vol. 5 (1935) to 11 (1954). British Museum.
- George, M Dorothy (1959). English Political Caricature. 2 Vols. Oxford University Press.
- George, M Dorothy (1964). London Life in the Eighteenth Century.
- George, M Dorothy (1967). Hogarth to Cruikshank: Social Change in Graphic Satire. Viking.

== See also ==
- Catalogue of Political and Personal Satires Preserved in the Department of Prints and Drawings in the British Museum
- List of historians
