= Samuel Collings (artist) =

British painter

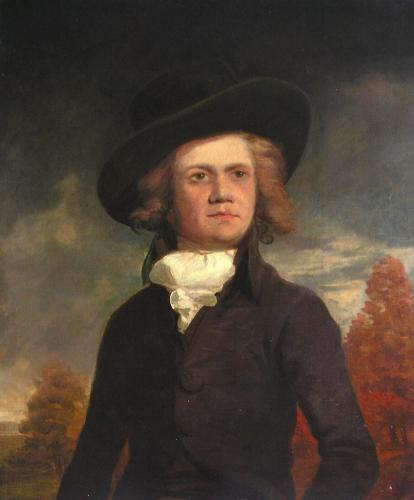
Self-portrait by Samuel Collings, circa 1789

Samuel Collings (fl. 1780–1790?) was a British painter and caricaturist of 18th century.

== Life ==
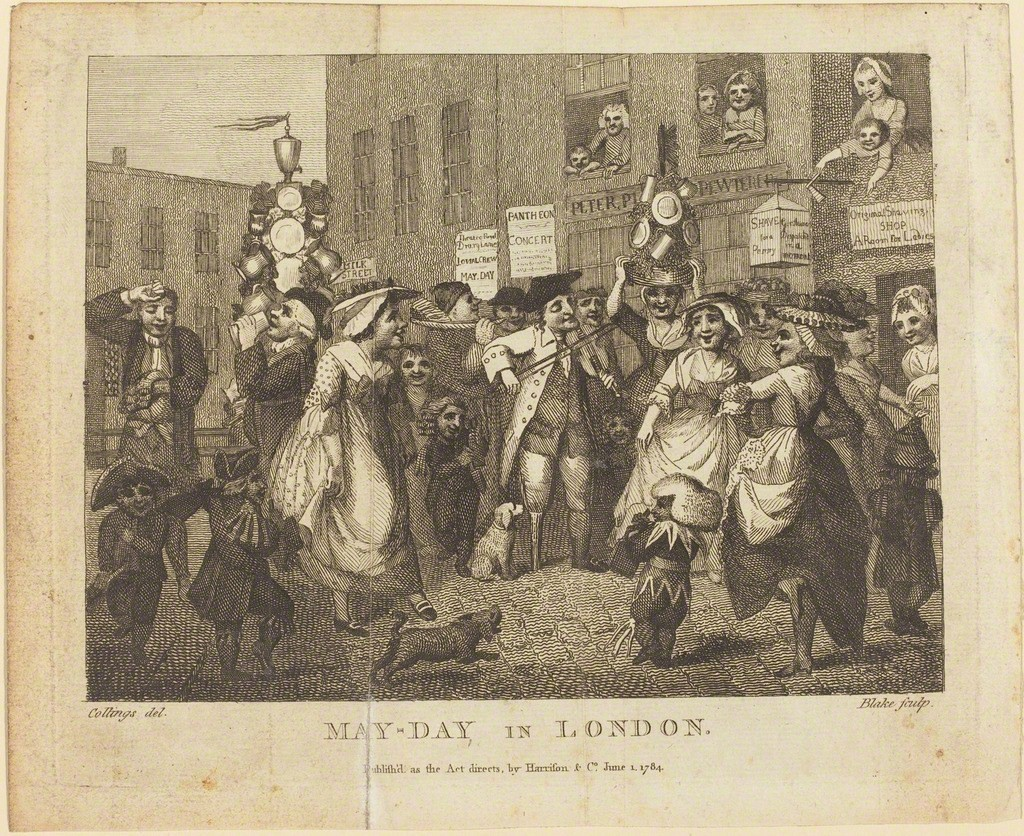
May Day in London, engraving by William Blake based on art by Samuel Collings, The Wits Magazine Vol I May 1784

He first appeared as an exhibitor at the Royal Academy in 1784, sending The Children in the Wood, a Sketch; in 1785 he exhibited The Chamber of Genius, which was engraved by Thomas Rowlandson; in 1786 The Triumph of Sensibility. He exhibited for the last time in 1789, sending 'The Frost on the Thames, sketched on the spot.'

Collings is best known, however, as a caricaturist; he was a friend of Thomas Rowlandson, and contributed designs, which were etched by Rowlandson for some of his satirical publications, notably the satires on Johnson and Boswell's Tour to the Hebrides, (published by Elizabeth Jackson in 1786), and on Goethe's The Sorrows of Young Werther. The original drawings for the former are in the South Kensington Museum, and have been erroneously attributed to Henry Bunbury.

To the Wit's Magazine for 1784 Collings contributed some designs of a humorous character, which were engraved by William Blake and others. To the same magazine he contributed verses, and seems to have been as productive with his pen as with his pencil. He painted a portrait of Lord Thurlow, which was engraved by J. Condé; a picture by him, entitled 'The Disinherited Heir,' was published in aquatint by Francis Jukes. It is not known when he died.

== Gallery ==
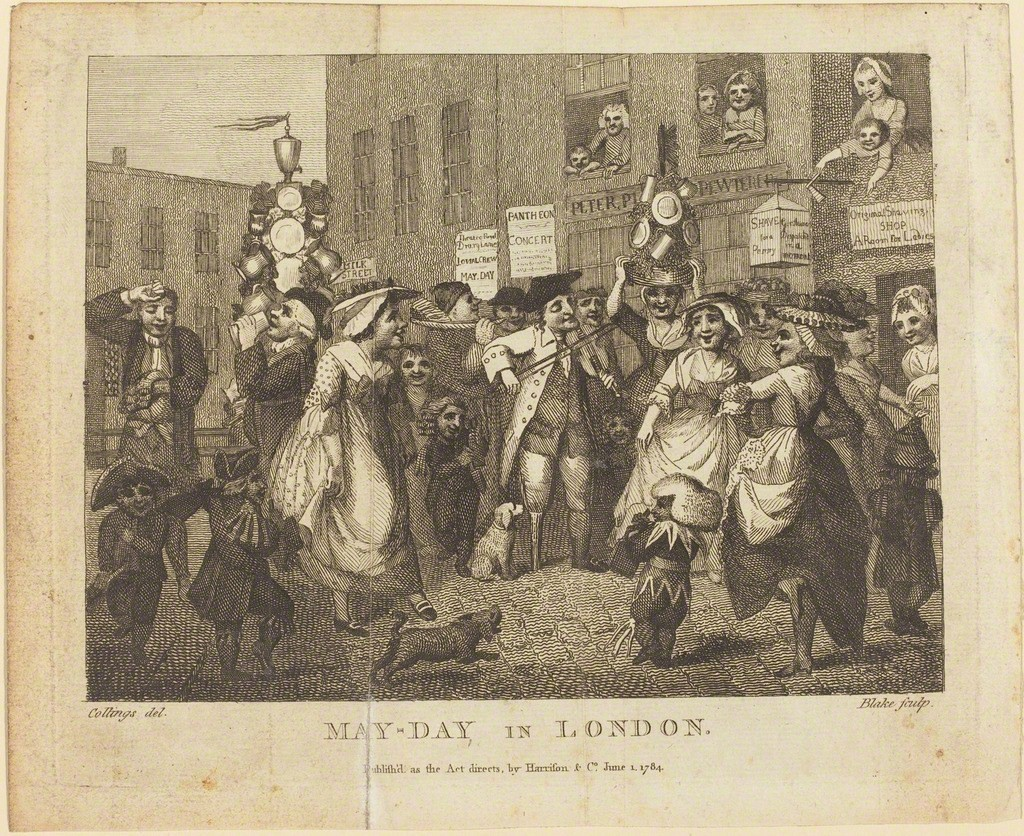
May-Day in London

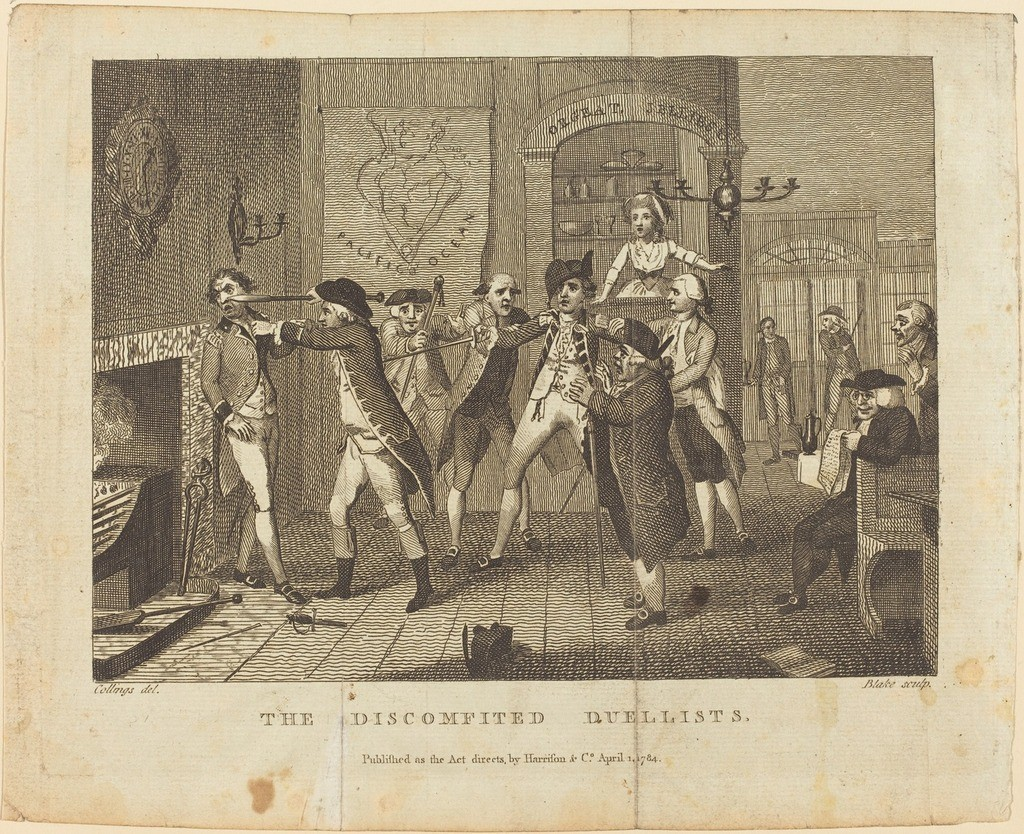
The Discomfited Duellists

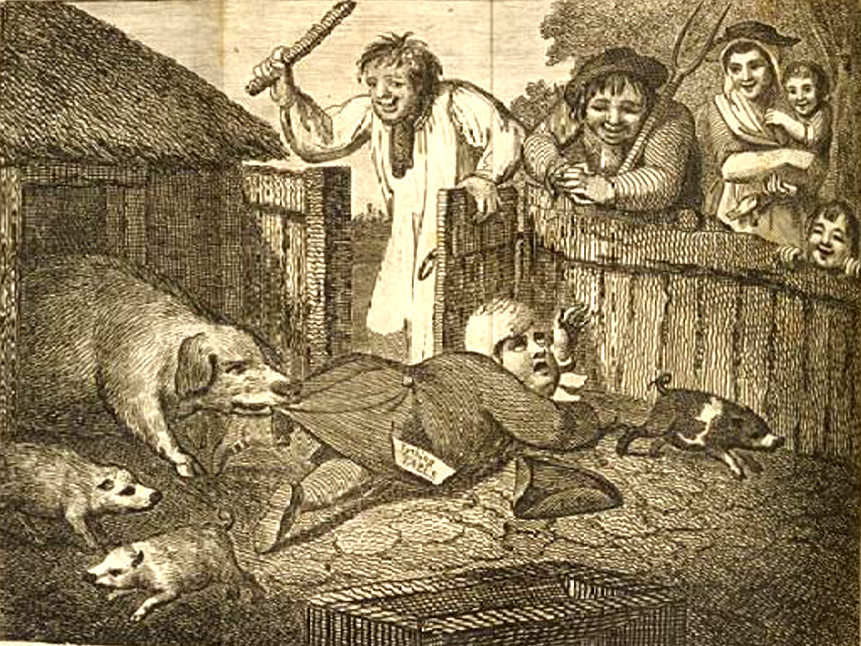
Tythe in Kind; or the Sow's Revenge (The Wit's Magazine Vol I Feb 1784)

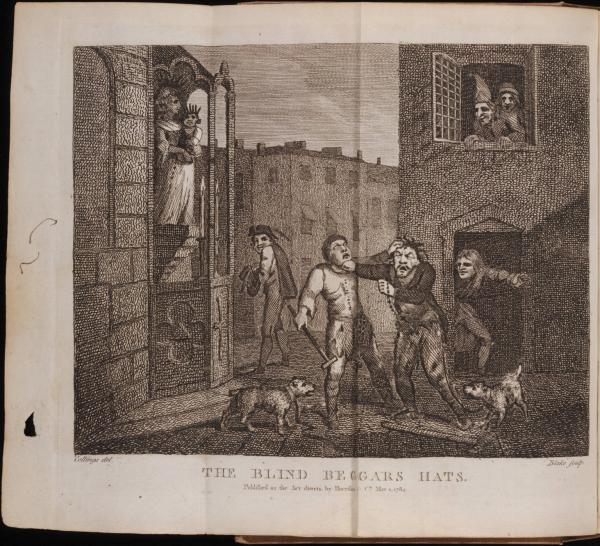
The Blind Beggars Hats

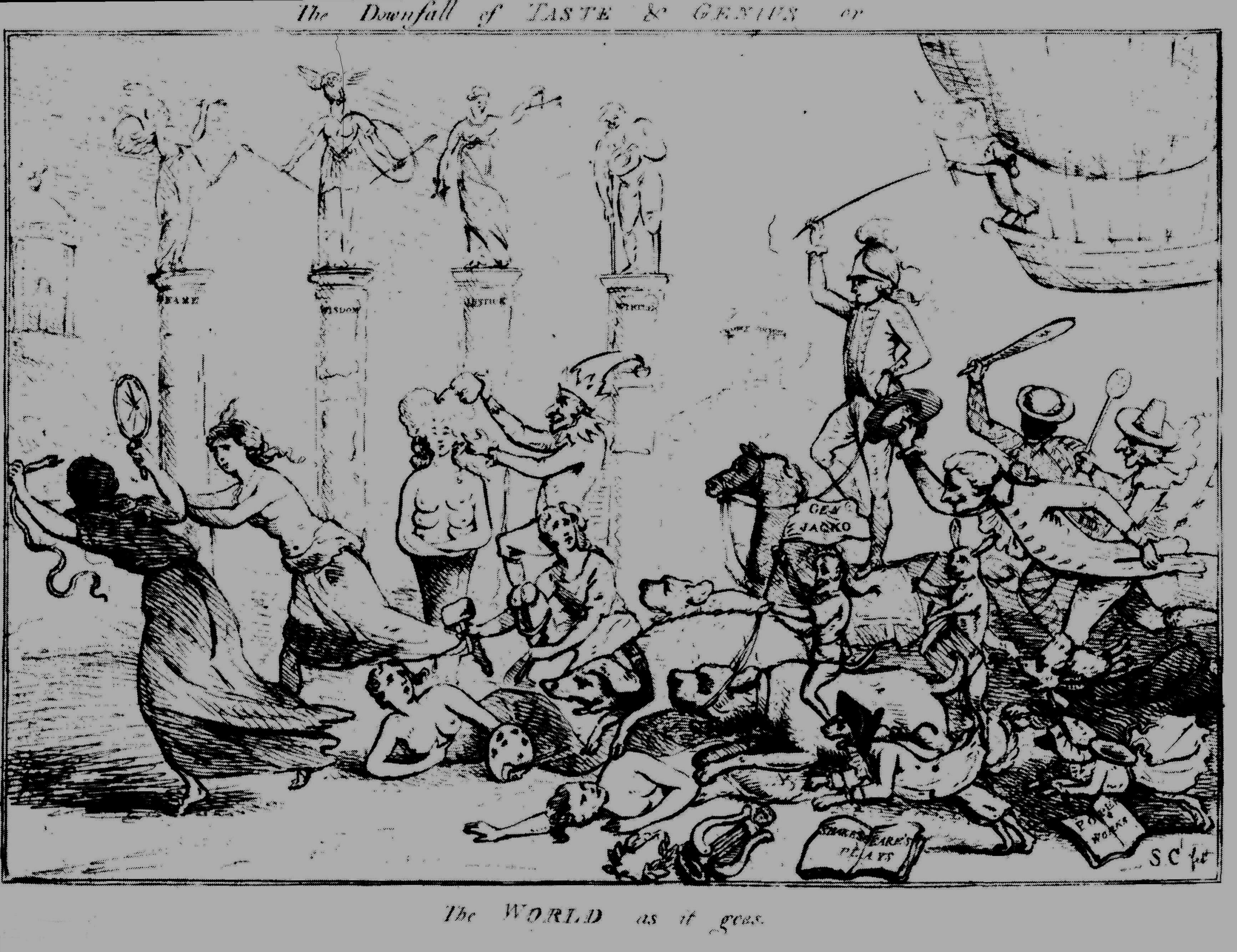
The Downfall of Taste and Genius

== Links ==
- "May-Day in London". British Museum.
- "The Discomfited Duellists". Fitzwilliam Museum. Archived from the original on 14 July 2014.
- "The Discomfited Duellists". National Gallery of Art, Washington D.C.
- "William Blake's World: "A New Heaven Is Begun"". Morgan Library and Museum.
