= John Sturt =

English engraver

John Sturt (6 April 1658 – August 1730) was an English engraver, apprenticed to Robert White. Becoming associated with John Ayres, he engraved the most important of his books on calligraphy. He is popularly known as an illustrator of The Pilgrim's Progress.

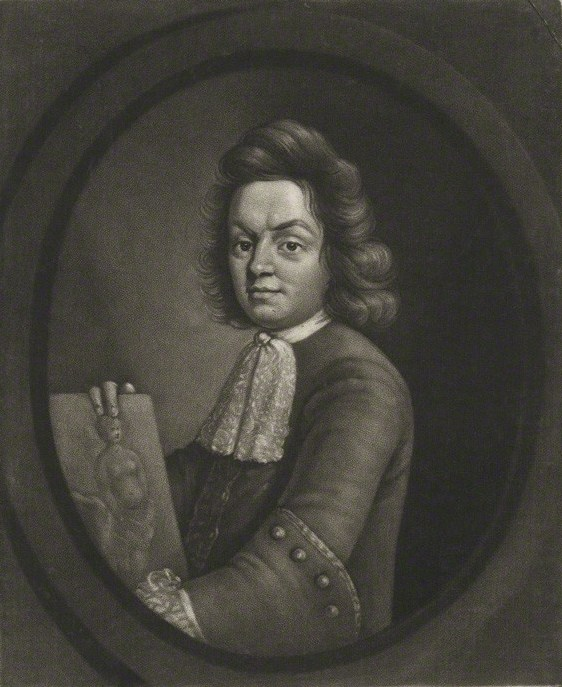
John Sturt, mezzotint by William Humphrey after William Faithorne the younger

== Life ==
He was born in London on 6 April 1658, and at the age of seventeen was apprenticed to Robert White, in whose manner he engraved a number of small portraits as frontispieces to books. Sturt at one time kept a drawing school in St. Paul's churchyard in partnership with Bernard Lens II. He died in London, poor, in August 1730.

== Works ==
Sturt executed the illustrations to many of the religious and artistic publications of the time, including:

- Francis Bragge's Passion of Our Saviour, 1694;
- Samuel Wesley's History of the Old and New Testament in Verse, 1704 and 1715;
- the English editions of Gerard Audran's Perspective of the Human Body, Andrea Pozzo's Rules of Perspective, and Charles Perrault's Treatise on the Five Orders of Architecture;
- Laurence Howell's View of the Pontificate, 1712;
- J. Hammond's Historical Narrative of the Whole Bible, 1727; and
- John Bunyan's Pilgrim's Progress, 1728.

He also engraved the Genealogy of George I, in two sheets, 1714; Chronological Tables of Europe, 1726; and a plate of the Seven Bishops, from a calligraphic drawing by Thomas Rodway. Sturt was the inventor of the class of prints known as "medleys", the first of which he published in 1706. His last employment was upon the plates to James Anderson's Selectus Diplomatum et Numismatum Thesaurus.

In association with John Ayres, Sturt engraved the writing-master's books on calligraphy. He engraved the Lord's Prayer within the space of a silver halfpenny, the Creed in that of a silver penny, and an elegy on Queen Mary so small that it could be inserted in a finger-ring. Sturt's most spectacular production of this kind was the Book of Common Prayer, executed on 188 silver plates, all adorned with borders and vignettes, the frontispiece being a portrait of George I, on which were inscribed, in characters legible only with a magnifying glass, the Creed, the Lord's Prayer, the Commandments, the prayer for the royal family, and the twenty-first psalm. This was published in 1717, and in 1721 he engraved, in a similar manner, the Orthodox Communicant.

== Notes ==
Attribution

This article incorporates text from a publication now in the public domain: "Sturt, John". Dictionary of National Biography. London: Smith, Elder & Co. 1885–1900.
