= Eleanor Lay =

British publisher and print-seller

Eleanor Lay, usually styled Mrs Lay (active 1788–1790 in Brighton), was a publisher and print-seller, with a fashionable print shop on The Steine in Brighton. As well as selling prints from London publishers, she designed and published a number of prints herself, including four views of Brighton in 1788, dedicated to Mrs Fitzherbert. The original watercolours by Lay are in the Brighton Museum.

In 1789, she published two prints by the young Thomas Rowlandson and also co-published several others for a drawing book by Rowlandson with the London publishers Samuel William Fores and John Harris.

One of her plates by Rowlandson A Sufferer for Decency was acquired by Thomas Tegg at some point and reissued by him with modified lettering in the 1810s in the Caricature Magazine.

== See also ==
- List of women printers and publishers before 1800
