= Samuel William Fores =

English publisher and printseller (1761-1838)

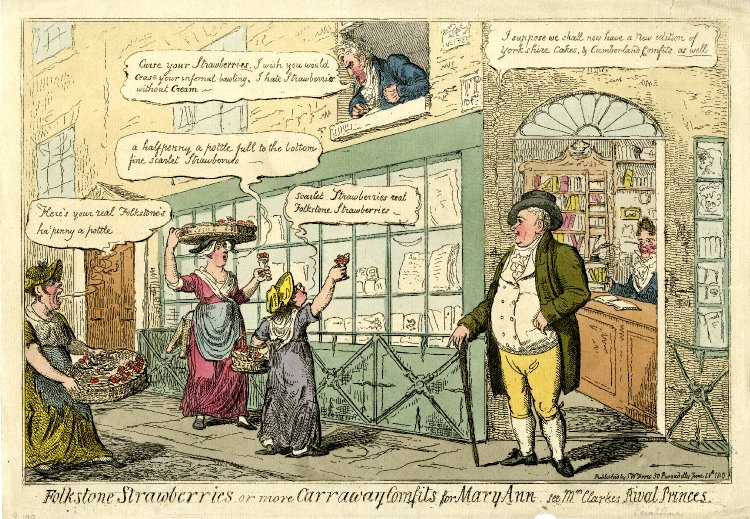
Illustration depicting the shop of Fores at the corner of Sackville Street and Piccadilly circa 1810.

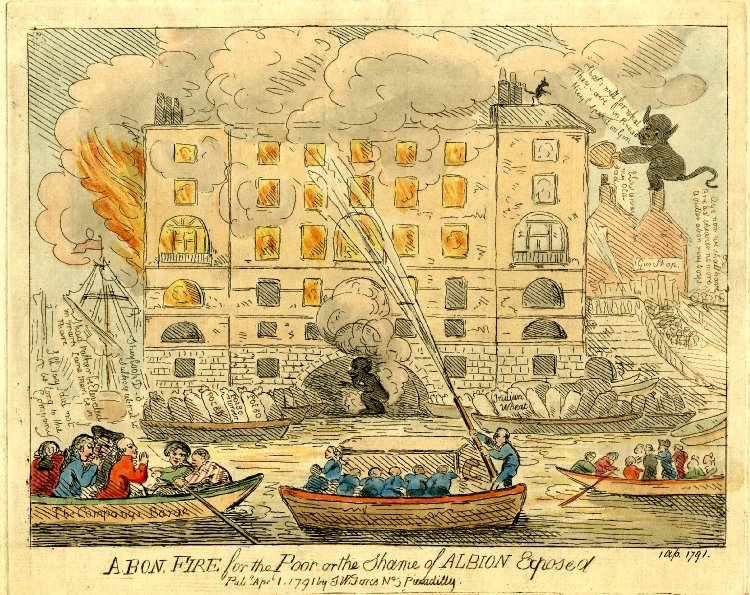
Illustration of the Albion Mills fire by Fores (1791)

Samuel William Fores, normally credited on his publications as S. W. Fores (8 March 1761 – 3 February 1838) was an English publisher and printseller with a renowned print shop at No 3 Piccadilly, London during the 'Golden Age' of Georgian satirical prints. Fores faced prosecution several times for the allegedly libellous nature of his satires. His sons George Thomas Fores (1806–58) and Arthur Blücher Fores (1814–83) succeeded him in the business, publishing predominantly sporting prints, and the family firm continued as printsellers and publishers for over 200 years.

Fores specialised in caricature, typically hand-coloured, singly issued prints., but also published series such as the 12 plates of Thomas Rowlandson's The Comforts of Bath (1798), and the 8 large plates of G.M. Woodwards's Pigmy Revels (1800). Fores published a number of books including a dual language French and English guidebook Fores New Guide to Foreigners,

== Life ==
Fores's father (1738-c1800) Samuel Fores was originally a cloth merchant and a member of the Draper's Company, but traded as a stationer and bookseller at 120 Strand. Samuel William was apprenticed to his father on 12 May 1775 at the age of 14. Having completed his 7-year apprenticeship in 1782, Samuel William began operating as a printseller in 1783 from No 3 Piccadilly. The same year he married his first wife Elizabeth Green (1758-1797]. The business flourished and in 1795 he moved up the street to larger premises at 50 Piccadilly (the address was renumbered to be No 41 in 1820).

Both by commissioning new plates from leading caricaturists, and by buying up plates from retiring or insolvent competitors such as Elizabeth Jackson, Fores built up a large stock of caricatures and became one of the leading London dealers, also supplying prints wholesale to provincial and foreign printsellers.

Fores was innovative and adroit in marketing his works in a highly competitive market; placing advertisements for his new issues in newspapers and magazines and advertising his print shop as a "Caricature Warehouse" - 'Where may be seen the completest collection of Caricatures &c in the Kingdom. Also the Head & Hand of Count Struenzee'. The mummified hand of the executed Danish physician Count Struensee was one of several sensational objects Fores included in his displays to attract visitors. After the French Revolution he added a six foot tall Complete Model of the Guillotine. Fores charged one shilling for entrance to his 'Museum', refundable against the price of any prints purchased. The shop became a noted London attraction for visitors.

Fores died in February 1838 at the age of 77 and was buried in his family vault at St. James Church in Jermyn Street.

=== Opinions ===
Fores was a supporter of William Pitt and opposed to Charles James Fox. His prints spoke against the depravities of the French Revolution and he led the way in producing satires against Napoleon, fashioning himself 'Caricaturist to the First Consul'. He became friends with political writer and fellow publisher William Hone (1780–1842) and several letters from their correspondence survive.

=== Family ===
Fores had five sons by his first wife Elizabeth Green; Samuel William Dakin (b.1785), Charles (b.1790), Henry Philip (b.1795), Richard (b.1796), Frederick William (b.1797) and a daughter Anna Marie (b.1792). Around 1800 he remarried to his second wife Jane Blucher (1772–1840) and had a further three sons; Horatio (b.1805), George Thomas (b.1806), and Arthur Blucher (b.1814) as well as four daughters; Emma (b.1804), Maria (b.1804), and Helen Lavinia (b.1809).

== Publications ==
The National Portrait Gallery documents 64 works published by Fores. The British Museum has around 250 prints published by his company in Samuel William Fores's lifetime. His caricatures included works by John Cawse, George Cruikshank, Isaac Cruikshank, James Gillray, Henry Heath, William Heath, Henry Kingsbury, Thomas Rowlandson, Henry Wigstead, Charles Williams a publisher he published caricatures, such as Rowlandson's Comforts of Bath series. One of his depictions was of the March 1791 fire at Albion Mills adjacent to Blackfriars Bridge.
