= William Humphrey (engraver) =

English engraver and printseller

William Humphrey (1740?–1810?) was an English engraver and printseller.

== Life ==
Born about 1740, Humphrey began life as an engraver and published from the Shell Warehouse, St Martin's lane between 1764 and 1774. In 1765 he obtained a premium from the Society of Arts for a mezzotint engraving of a self-portrait of Rembrandt.

Later in life Humphrey concentrated on printselling. He made journeys to Holland and elsewhere on the continent and had a penchant for collecting English portraits. He became the chief agent for the major private collections of portraits made about this time. At one time he took Charles Howard Hodges, the engraver, to Amsterdam, where Hodges established himself. There is a trade card for him engraved from him by Francis Bartolozzi in the Banks collection in the British Museum

Humphrey was residing at 227 Strand in 1785. This was also the first address of his sister Hannah's shop where she sold James Gillray's prints before moving to Bond Street. He died probably about 1810 in a particular state of debt.

== Works ==
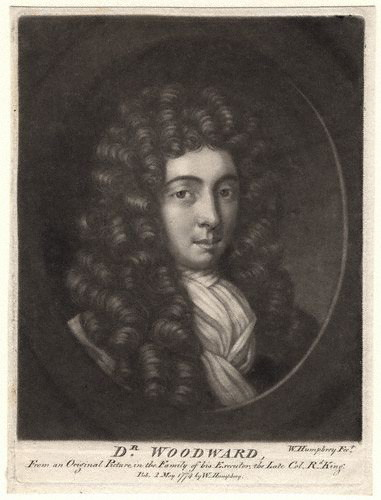
John Woodward, mezzotint by William Humphrey

Humphrey engraved portraits in mezzotint, some after Robert Edge Pine. That of John Sturt the engraver was after William Faithorne the younger; of Colonel Richard King, after Godfrey Kneller; Mr Mannock, brother of Sir William Mannock, after Samuel Cooper; of Madame Du Barry, from a drawing by Benjamin Wilson; and others. He also etched a few small portraits, and engraved in stipple Cupid and Psyche and Beauty and Time, from his own drawings, and The Nativity of Christ, after John Singleton Copley.

The British Museum has around 380 prints published by Humphreys including a large number of political satires relating to the 1784 Westminster Election, with important early works that helped establish the printmaking careers of both Thomas Rowlandson and James Gillray; these are described in the Catalogue of Political and Personal Satires Preserved in the Department of Prints and Drawings in the British Museum. Humphrey's output also included mezzotint portraits (he reissued a number of plates originally published by John Raphael Smith) as well as mezzotint drolls.
