= Henry Wigstead =

Scottish painter (1861–1951)

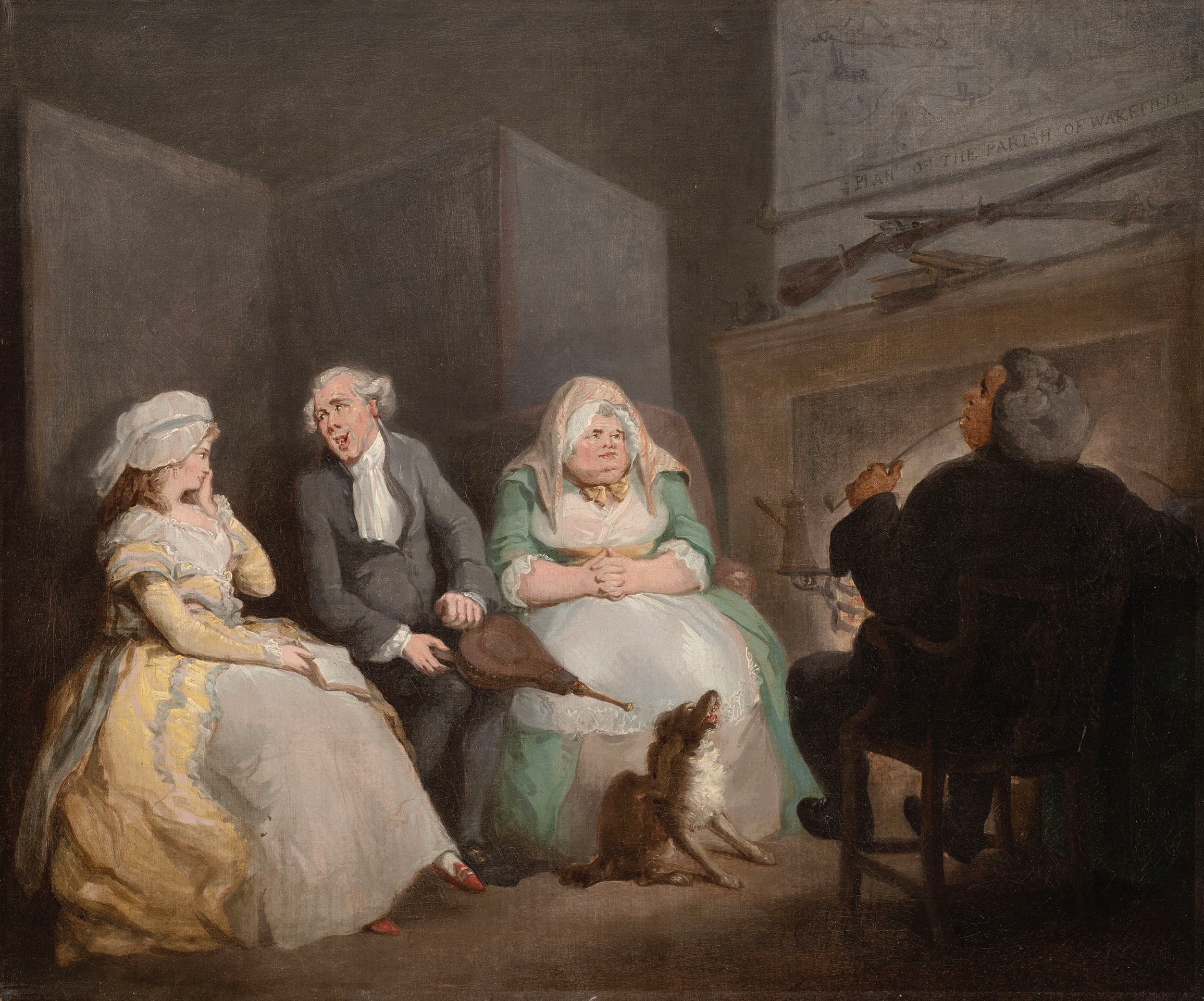
- A Country Vicar's Fire-Side c. 1786
- Born: c. 1760; London, England
- Died: 1800; Margate, Kent

Henry Wigstead (died 1800) was an English Magistrate, publisher, businessman, amateur painter & caricaturist.

He was a patron and close personal friend of Thomas Rowlandson, whom he accompanied on sketching trips to the Isle of Wight (1784), Brighton (1789) and Wales (1787) which resulted in subsequent publications for which Rowlandson provided the illustrations.

Wigstead exhibited at the RA exhibition of 1785. His style appears to be close to Rowlandson, who created prints of many of his works, often signing them as Wigstead.

Wigstead also ran a successful interior decorating business and in June 1788 was appointed "House painter to His Royal Highness the Prince of Wales". His company worked on the Royal Pavilion for the Prince of Wales (the future George IV) When George III became incapacitated, the Prince hired Wigstead to distribute satirical caricatures across England attacking the king and those in William Pitt the Younger's cabinet who the Prince believed were frustrating his claim to the Regency. Although Wigstead's name was associated with these prints, the recent discovery of payments to Thomas Rowlandson confirm that his friend was the actual artist. Wigstead died at Margate.

Wigstead's only known surviving work in oil, A Country Vicar's Fireside, was rediscovered by art dealer Xander Haveron-Jones in 2024. Yale University's Lewis Walpole Library acquired the work for their collection in March 2025. The painting was exhibited at the Royal Academy in 1786, and had long been attributed to William Hogarth.

== Works ==
- Wigstead, H & Rowlandson T : An Excursion to Brighthelmstone, made in the year 1789, by Henry Wigstead and Thomas Rowlandson, with eight engravings by TR Geo and J.Robinson, London, 1790
- Wigstead, H: Remarks on a Tour to North and South Wales in the year 1797 by Henry Wigstead - W.Wigstead, London, 1800
