= Thomas Rowlandson =

English artist and caricaturist (1757–1827)

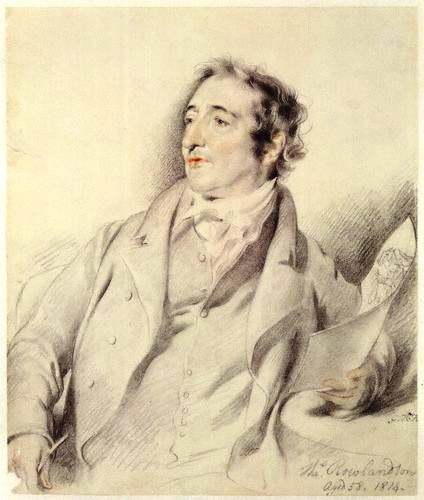
- Pencil sketch by George Henry Harlow, 1814
- Born: 13 July 1757; London, England
- Died: 21 April 1827 (aged 69); London, England
- Occupation: Artist

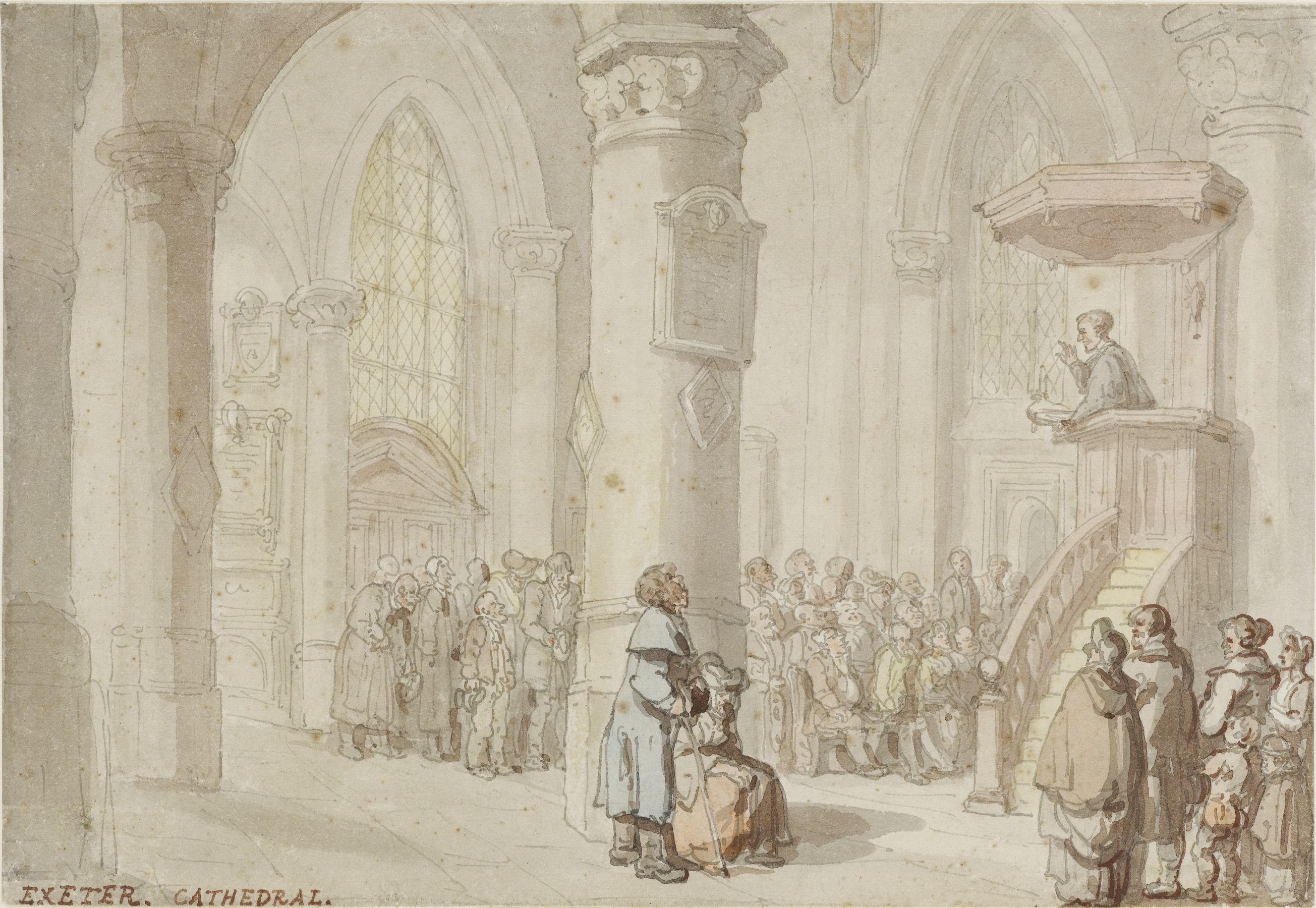
A Sermon in Exeter Cathedral, pencil, pen and ink on paper

Thomas Rowlandson (/ˈroʊləndsən/; 13 July 1757 – 21 April 1827) was an English artist and caricaturist of the Georgian Era, noted for his political satire and social observation. A prolific artist and printmaker, Rowlandson produced both individual social and political satires, as well as a large number of illustrations for novels, humorous books, and topographical works. Like other caricaturists of his age such as James Gillray, his caricatures are often robust or bawdy. His caricatures included those of people in power such as the Duchess of Devonshire, William Pitt the Younger and Napoleon Bonaparte. Rowlandson also produced erotica for a private clientele; this was never published publicly at the time and is now only found in a small number of collections.

== Biography ==
Rowlandson was born in Old Jewry, in the City of London. He was baptised on 23 July 1757 at St Mary Colechurch, London, to William and Mary Rowlandson. The baptismal record for St Mary, now in the London archives, clearly gives his birth-date as 13 July 1757, not 1756 as given in most earlier biographies. His father, William, had been a weaver, but had moved into trading supplies for the textile industry. After overextending himself, he was declared bankrupt in 1759. Life became difficult for William in London and, in late 1759, he moved his family to Richmond, North Yorkshire. Thomas's uncle James died in 1764, and his widow Jane probably provided both the funds and accommodation which allowed Thomas to attend school in London.

In 1765 or 1766 Rowlandson started at the Soho Academy of Dr Cuthbert Barwis at 8 Soho Square, then "an academy of some celebrity". One of his classmates was Richard Burke, son of the politician Edmund Burke. As a schoolboy, Rowlandson "drew humourous characters of his master and many of his scholars before he was ten years old," covering the margins of his schoolbooks with his artwork. There is no documentary evidence that Rowlandson took drawing classes at the mainly business-oriented school, but it seems likely, as on leaving school in 1772, he became a student at the Royal Academy. According to his obituary of 22 April 1827 in The Gentleman's Magazine, Rowlandson was sent to Paris at the age of 16 (1772), and spent two years studying in a "drawing academy". there. In Paris he studied drawing "the human figure" and continued developing his youthful skill in caricature. It was on his return to London that he took classes at the Royal Academy, then based at Somerset House.

Rowlandson spent six years studying at the Royal Academy, but about a third of this time was spent in Paris where he may have studied under Jean-Baptiste Pigalle. He later made frequent tours to the Continent, enriching his portfolios with numerous sketches of life and character. In 1775 he exhibited a drawing of Dalilah Payeth Sampson a Visit while in Prison at Gaza at the Royal Academy and two years later received a silver medal for a bas-relief figure. He was spoken of as a promising student. On the death of his aunt, he inherited £7,000 with which he plunged into the dissipations of the town and was known to sit at the gaming-table for 36 hours at a stretch.

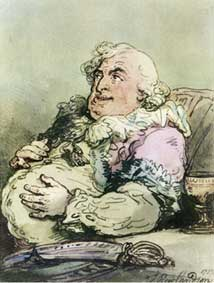
Discomforts of an Epicure, a self-portrait from 1787, showed that he could aim his caricatures at himself.

In time poverty overtook him; and the friendship and examples of James Gillray and Henry William Bunbury seem to have suggested caricature as a means of earning a living. His drawing of Vauxhall, shown in the Royal Academy exhibition of 1784, had been engraved by Pollard, and the print was a success. Rowlandson was largely employed by Rudolph Ackermann, the art publisher, who in 1809—issued in his Poetical Magazine The Schoolmaster's Tour—a series of plates with illustrative verses by Dr. William Combe. They were the most popular of the artist's works. Again engraved by Rowlandson himself in 1812, and issued under the title of the Tour of Dr Syntax in Search of the Picturesque, they had attained a fifth edition by 1813, and were followed in 1820 by Dr Syntax in Search of Consolation, and in 1821 by the Third Tour of Dr Syntax in Search of a Wife. He also produced a body of erotic prints and woodcuts.

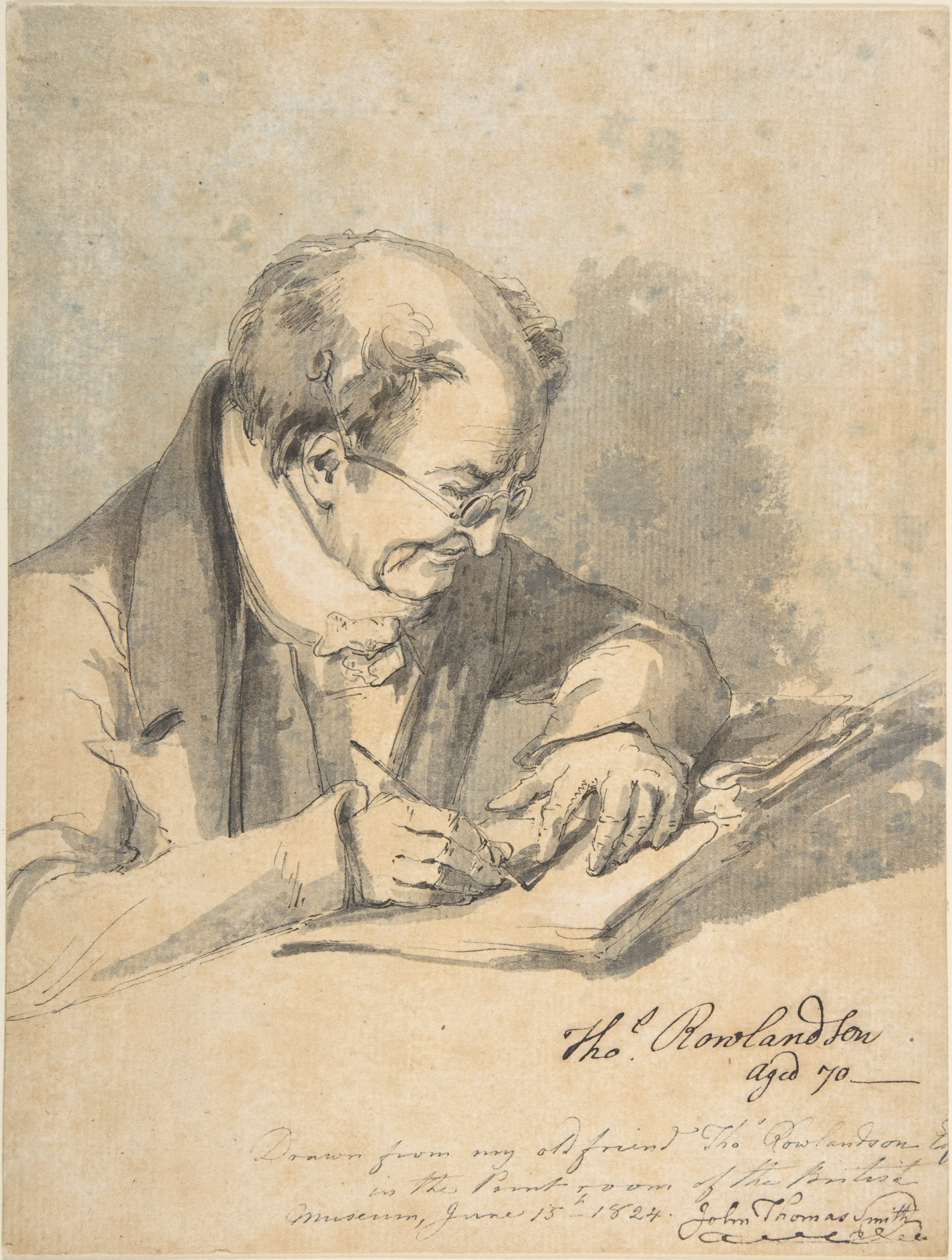
Rowlandson at work in later life, drawn by John Thomas Smith

The same collaboration of designer, author and publisher appeared in the English Dance of Death, issued in 1814–16 and in the Dance of Life, 1817. Rowlandson also illustrated Smollett, Goldsmith and Sterne, and his designs will be found in The Spirit of the Public Journals (1825), The English Spy (1825), and The Humorist (1831).

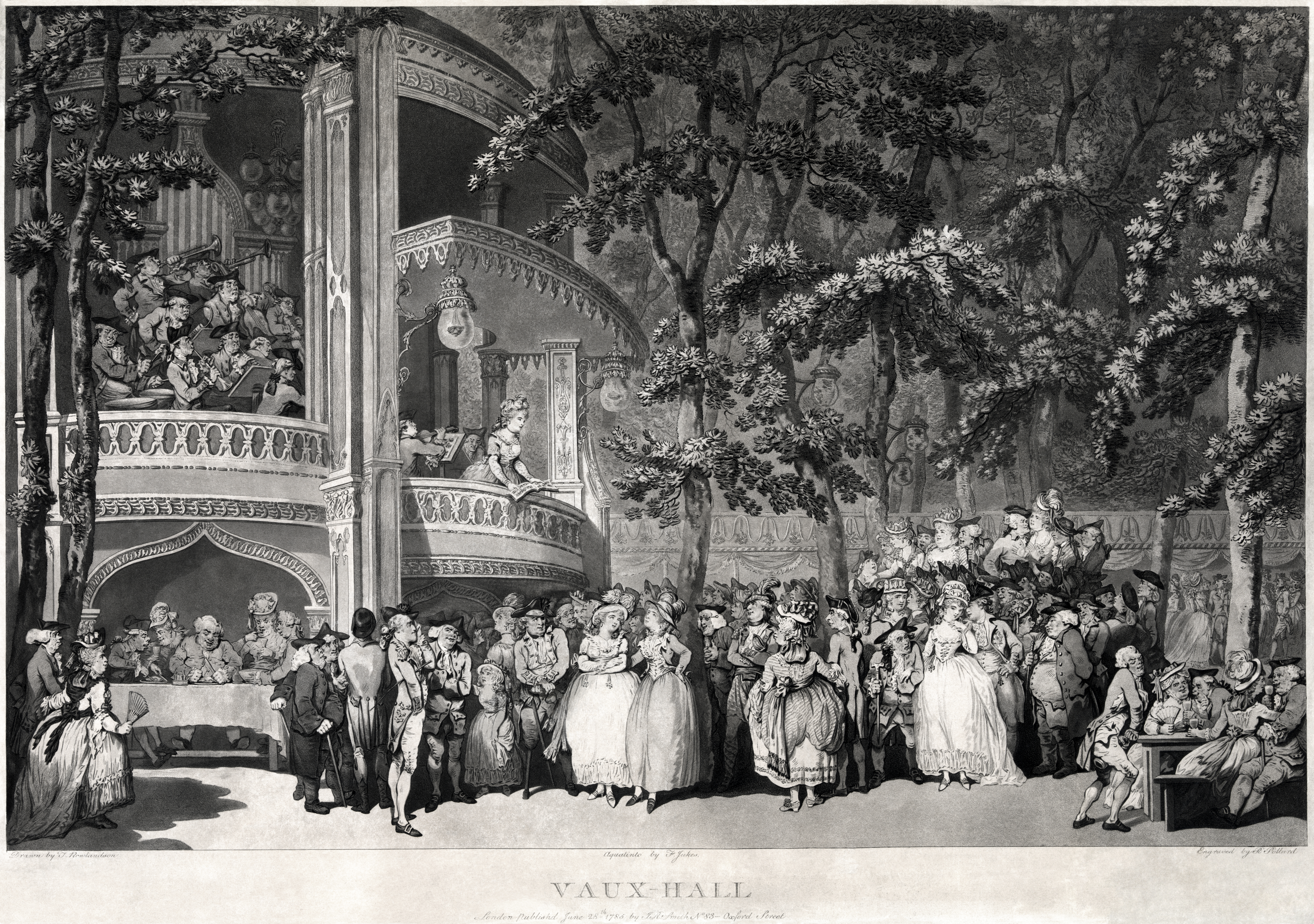
Vauxhall Gardens (1785). The two women in the centre are Georgiana, Duchess of Devonshire, and her sister Lady Duncannon. The man seated at the table on the left is Samuel Johnson, with James Boswell to his left and Oliver Goldsmith to his right. To the right the actress and author Mary Darby Robinson stands next to the Prince of Wales, later George IV.

Rowlandson's designs were usually done in outline with the reed-pen, and delicately washed with colour. They were then etched by the artist on the copper, and afterwards aquatinted—usually by a professional engraver, the impressions being finally coloured by hand. As a designer he was characterised by his facility and ease of draughtsmanship. He dealt less frequently with politics than his fierce contemporary, Gillray, but commonly touching, in a rather gentle spirit, the various aspects and incidents of social life. His most artistic work is to be found among the more careful drawings of his earlier period; but even among the exaggerated caricature of his later time we find hints that this master of the humorous might have attained to the beautiful had he so willed.

His work included a personification of the United Kingdom named John Bull who was developed from about 1790 in conjunction with other British satirical artists such as James Gillray and George Cruikshank. He also produced many works depicting the characters involved in election campaigns and race meetings. However, his satirical works of London's street life such as the "pleasure gardens at Vauxhall, jostling with soldiers, students, tarts and society beauties", which exhibit acute social observation and commentary are amongst his finest.

Rowlandson's caricatures include those on the medical profession which developed through his friendship with John Wolcot around 1778. He also earned money illustrating books of physicians and quacks. Later in life, he also produced caricatures on medical themes.

His patron and friend Matthew Michell collected hundreds of his paintings which Michell displayed at his country residence, Grove House in Enfield, Middlesex. After Michell's death his nephew, Sir Henry Onslow, sold the contents of Grove House at an eight-day sale in November 1818. One of the best-known of Rowlandson's paintings is "Hengar House the seat of Matthw [sic] Mitchell Esqr., Cornwall" (1812) which was sold at the Sir Richard Onslow sale, Sotheby's, 15 July 1959. Another of Rowlandson's paintings is "Glorious Defeat of the Dutch Navy Octr 10 1797, by Admirals Lord Duncan and Sir Richard Onslow, with a View Drawn on the Spot of the Six Dutch Line of Battle Ships Captured and Brought into Yarmouth" (1797). Rowlandson also painted early scenes of Brighton where Michell's sister, Lady Anne Onslow, lived after the death of her husband Sir Richard Onslow, 1st Baronet. Rowlandson's painting "Mr Michell's Picture Gallery at Grove House, Enfild" was sold by Sotheby's, London, on 4 July 2002.

Rowlandson died on 21 April 1827 aged 69 years, at his lodgings at 1 James Street, Adelphi, London, after a prolonged illness. He was buried at St Paul's, Covent Garden on 28 April 1827. Some authors have suggested that his housekeeper Betsy Winter who inherited his belongings was his mistress but this has been rejected by others.

== Works ==
- Cupids Magick Lantern Etchings for a work by George Moutard Woodward, 1797–98
- Horse accomplishments Etchings for a work by George Moutard Woodward, 1797–98
- Matrimonial Comforts (series of eight sketches) c. 1799
- Le Brun Travestied or Caricatures of the Passions Etchings for a work by George Moutard Woodward, 1800
- The Schoolmaster's Tour, accompanied by verses by William Combe (published in the new Poetical Magazine) 1809–11
- Tour of Dr. Syntax in Search of the Picturesque, 1812
- The Second Tour of Dr. Syntax in Search of Consolation, 1820
- The Third Tour of Dr. Syntax in Search of a Wife, 1821
- The English Dance of Death, 1815–16
- The Dance of Life, 1816–17
- Characteristic Sketches of the Lower Orders (series of sketches), 1820
- An Essay on the Art of Ingeniously Tormenting (sc Thomas Rowlandson), 1808
- Chesterfield Travestied, or School for Modern Manners (sc Thomas Rowlandson), 1808

== Gallery ==
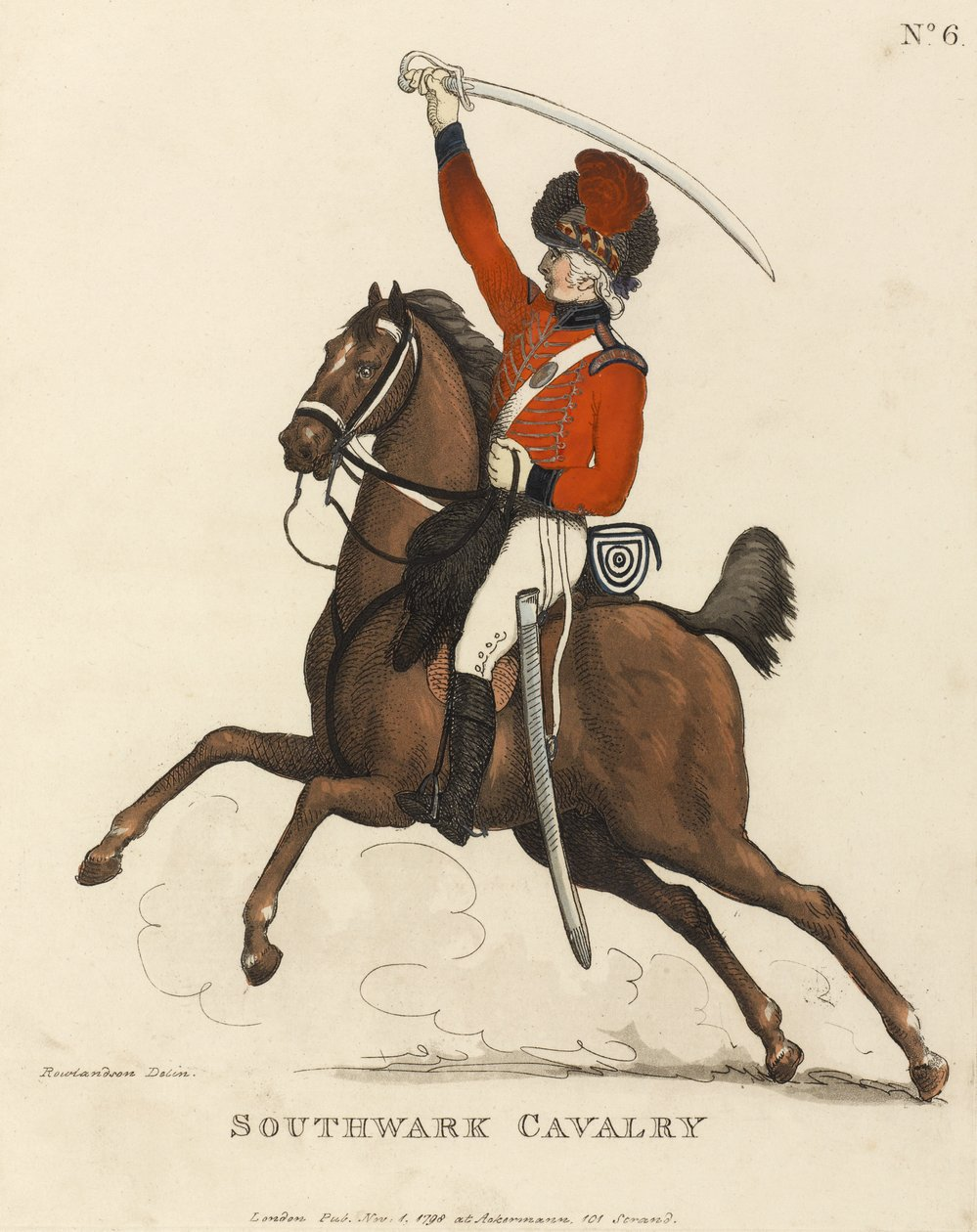
"Southwark Cavalry", c. 1798

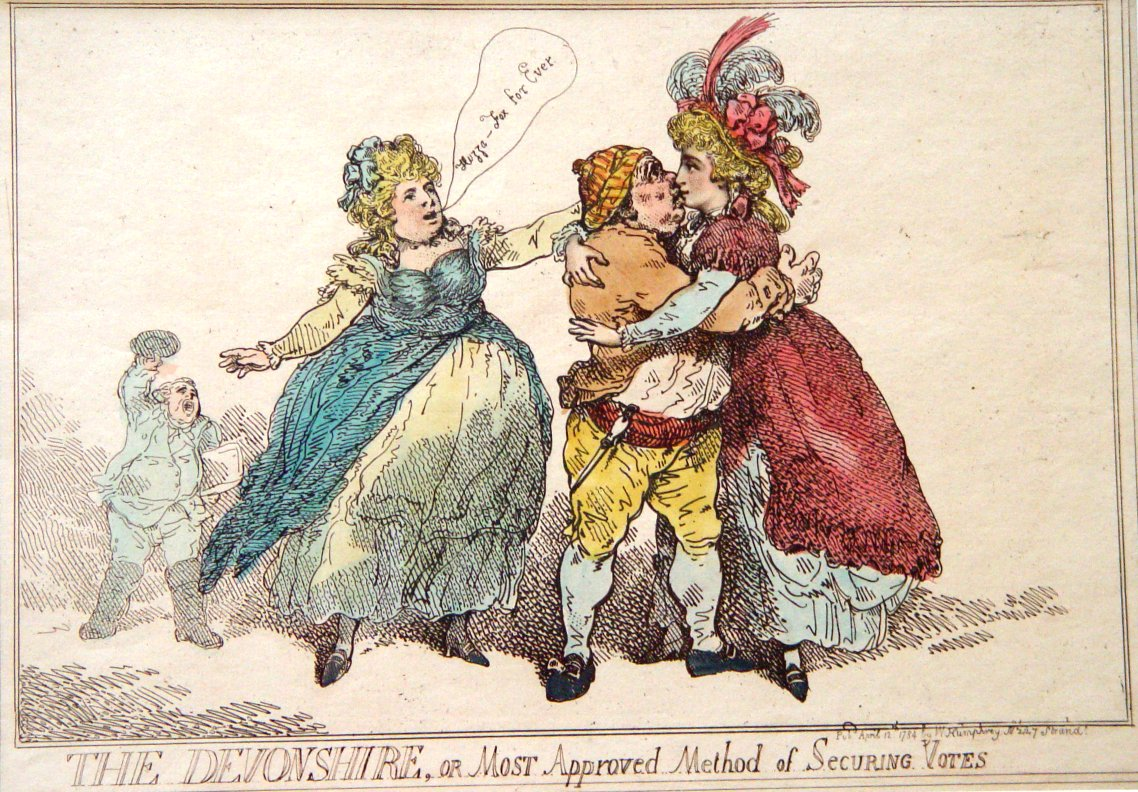
"The Devonshire, or Most Approved Method of Securing Votes", 1784

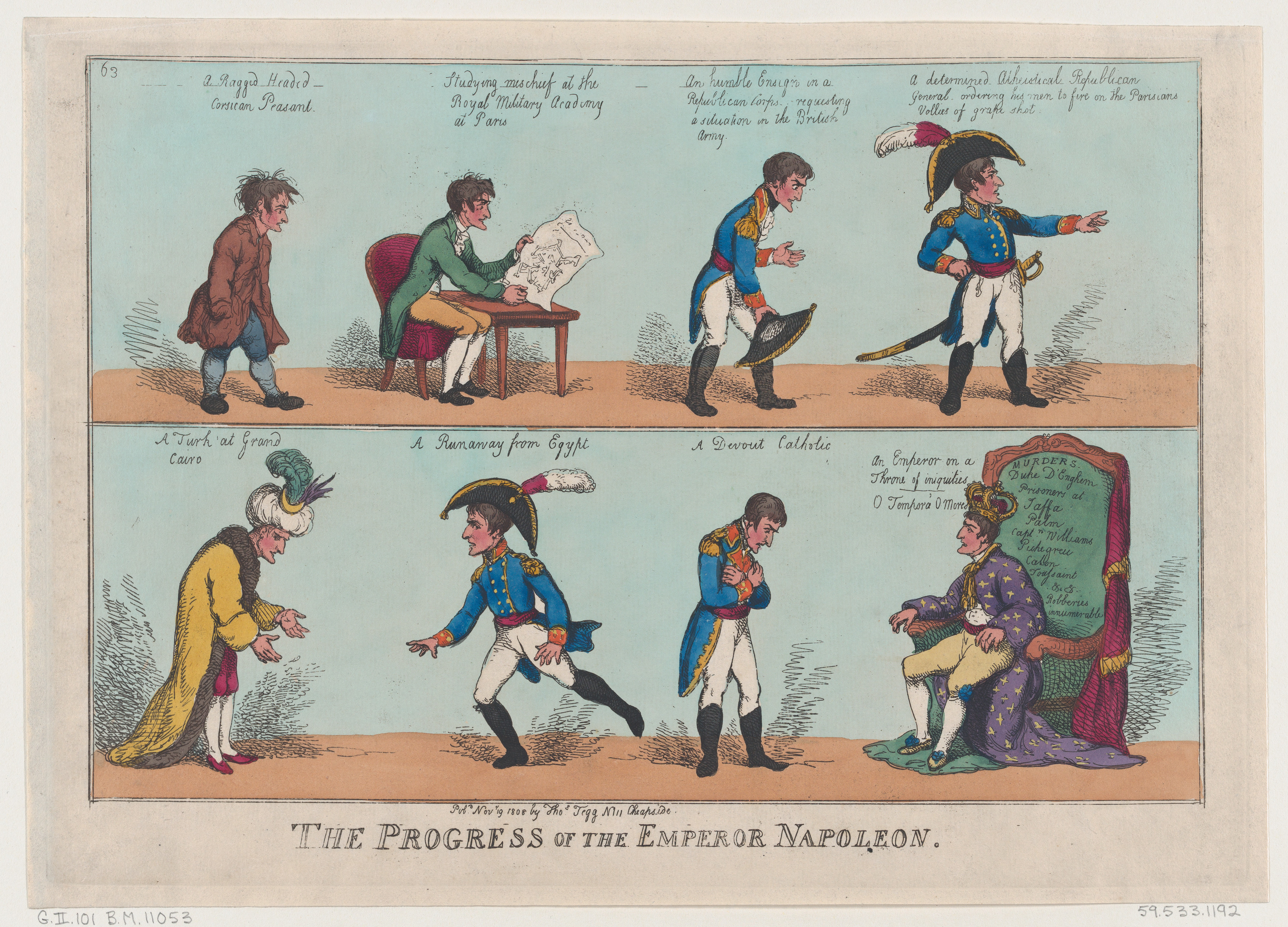
"The Progress of the Emperor Napoleon", 1808

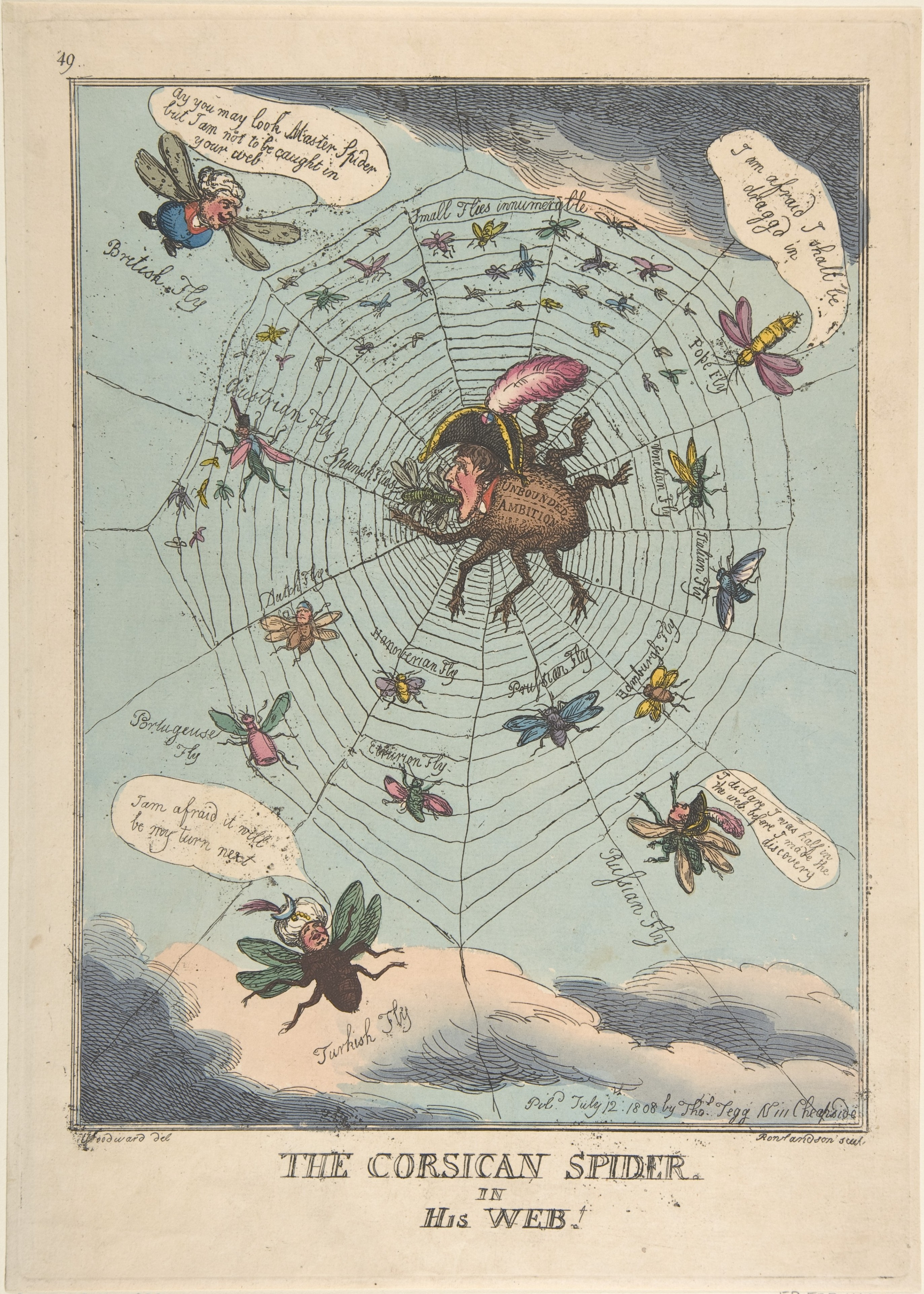
"The Corsican Spider in His Web", 1808

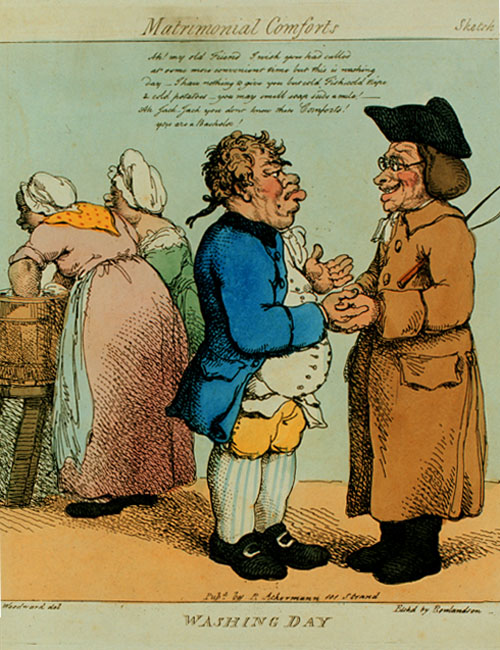
"Washing Day" from Matrimonial Comforts, 1811

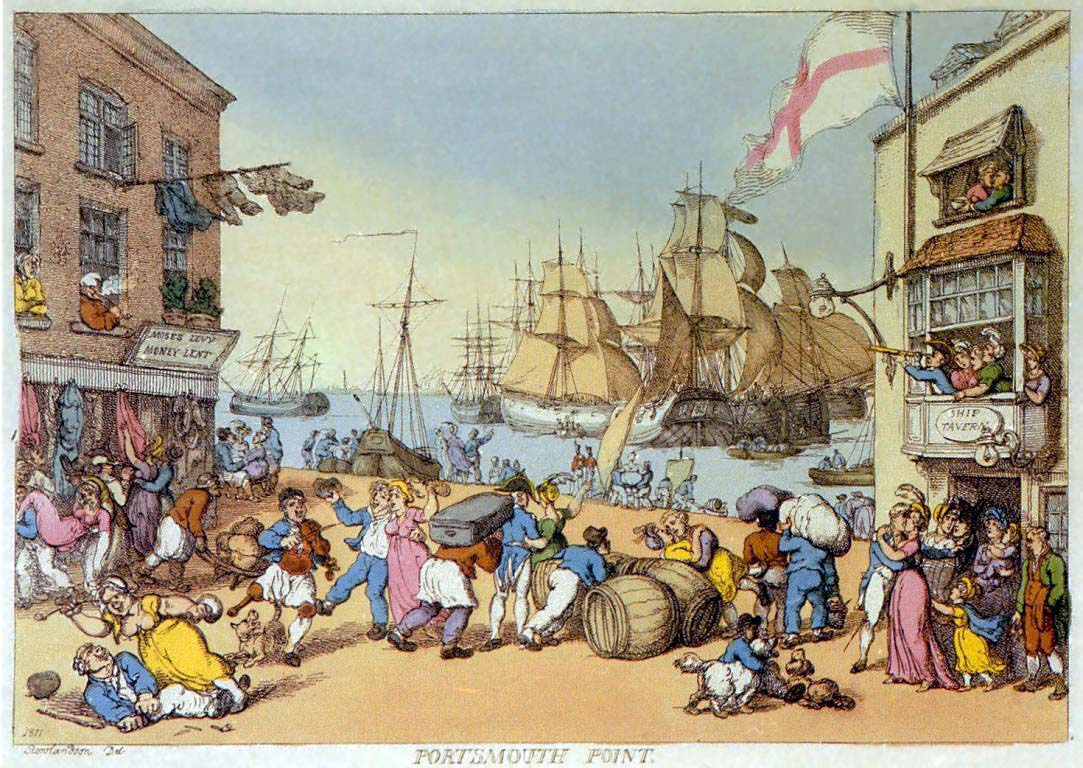
"Portsmouth Point"

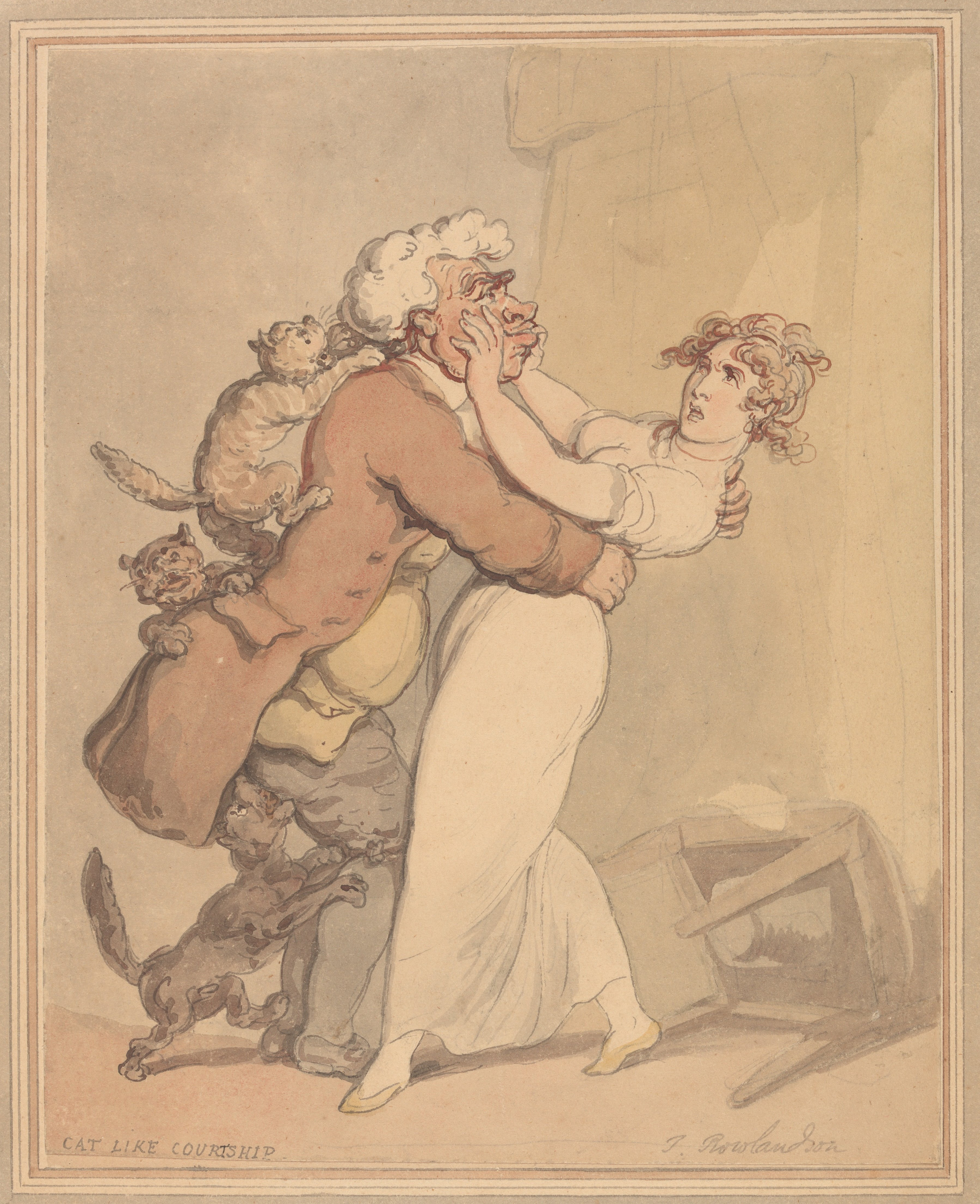
Cat Like Courtship

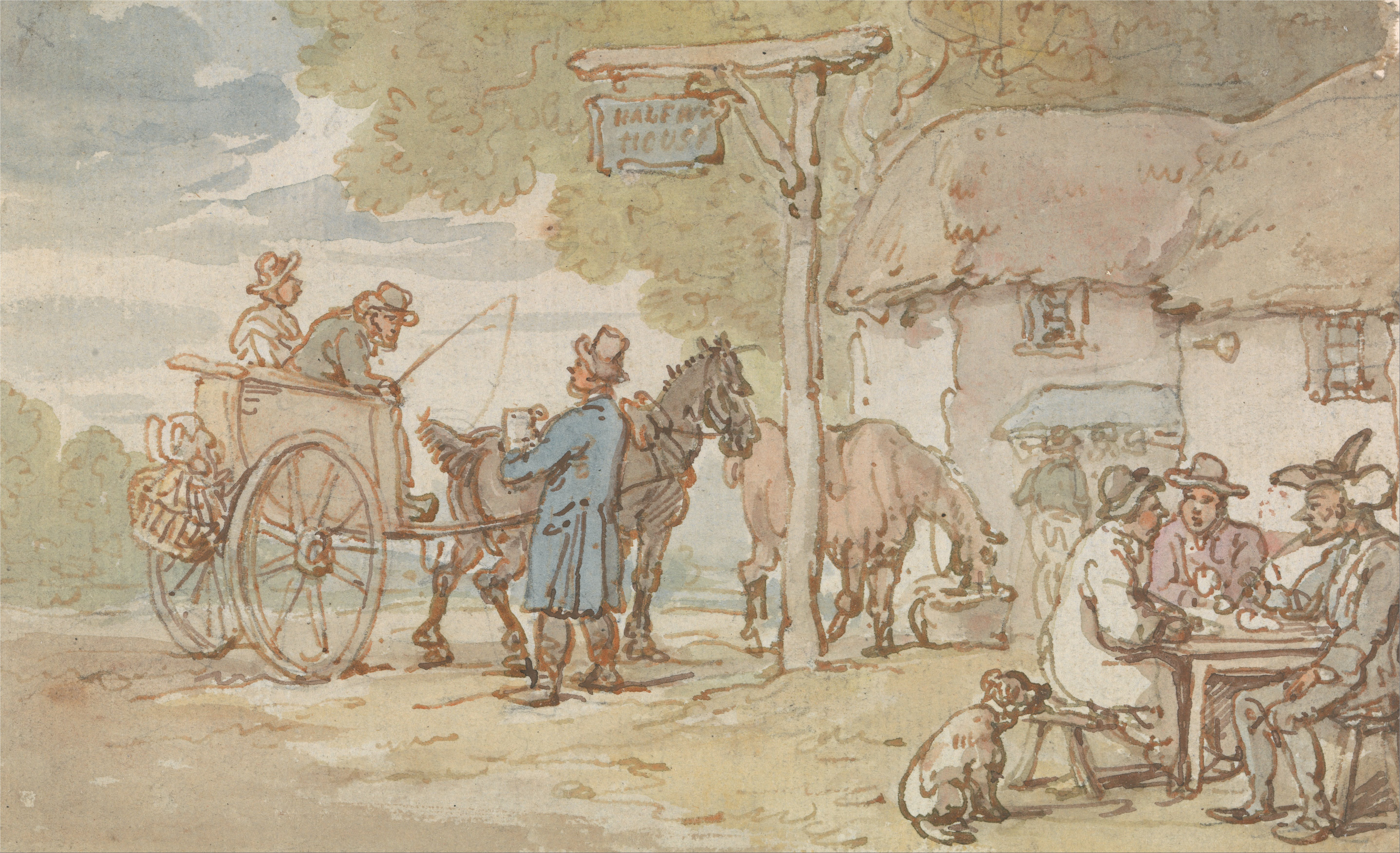
"Dr Syntax outside the Halfway House" from Dr Syntax in Search of the Picturesque, 1812

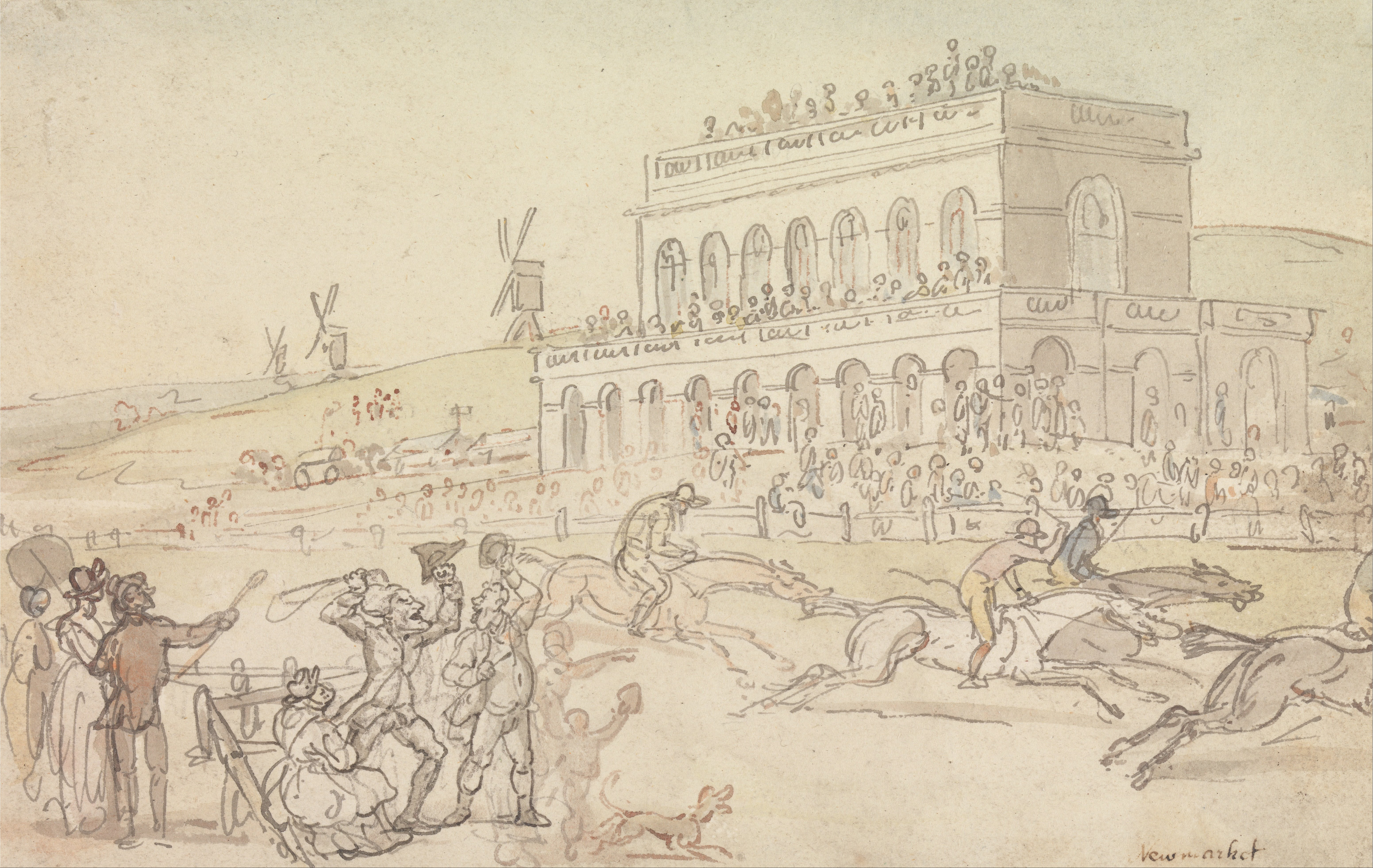
"Doctor Syntax loses his Money on the Race Ground at York" 1812

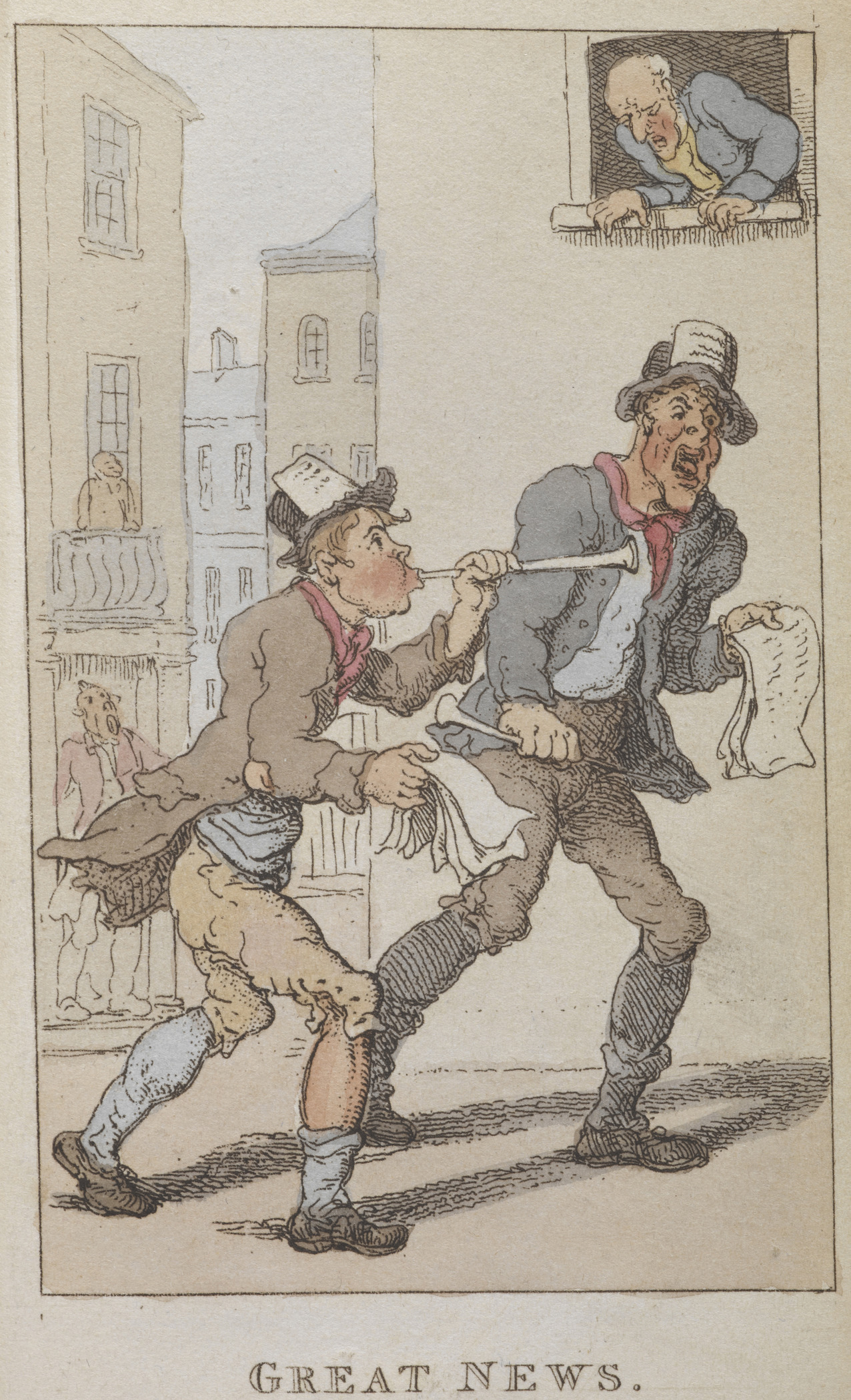
"Great News" from Characteristic Sketches of the Lower Orders, 1820

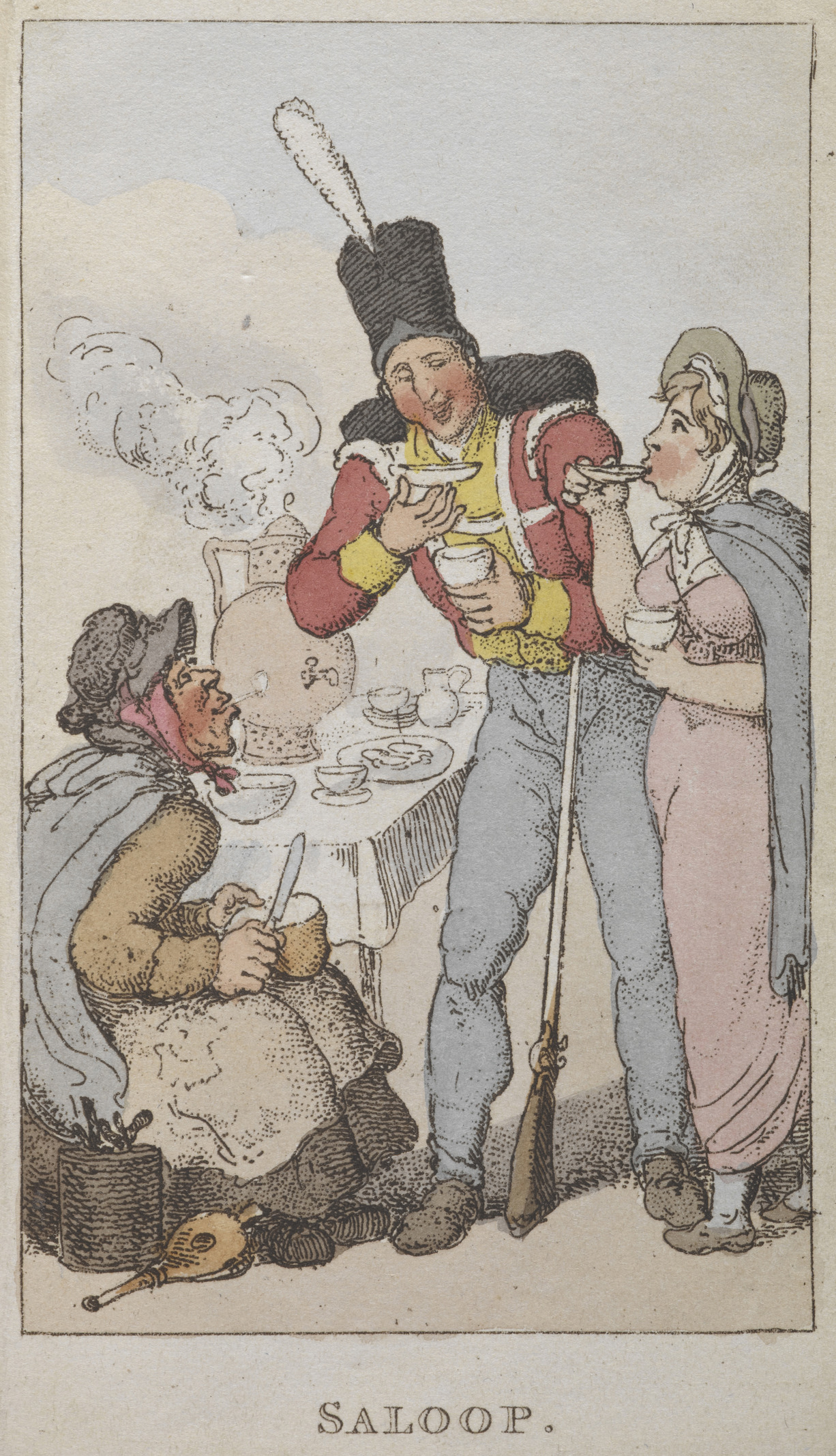
"Saloop" from Characteristic Sketches of the Lower Orders, 1820

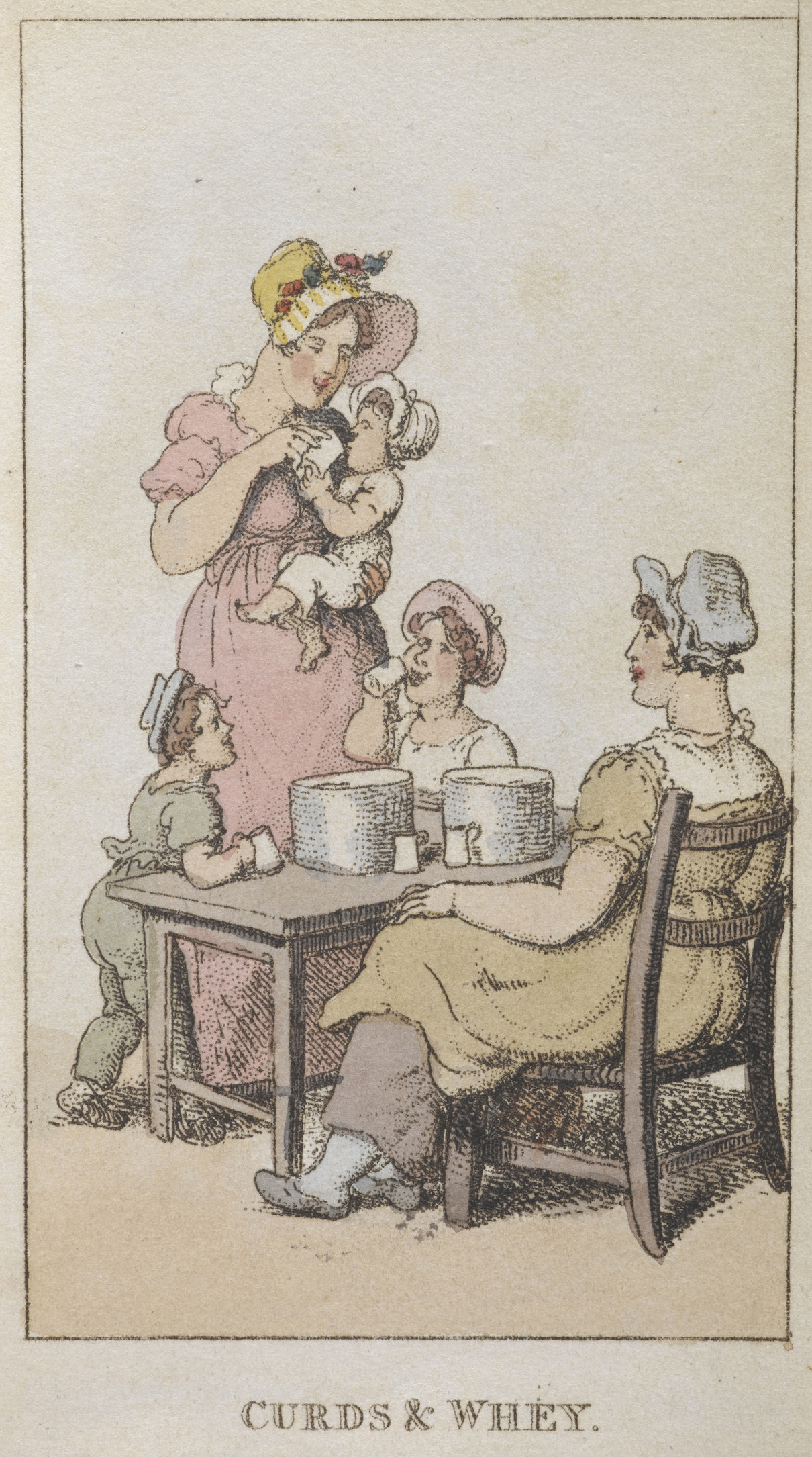
"Curds and Whey" from Characteristic Sketches of the Lower Orders, 1820

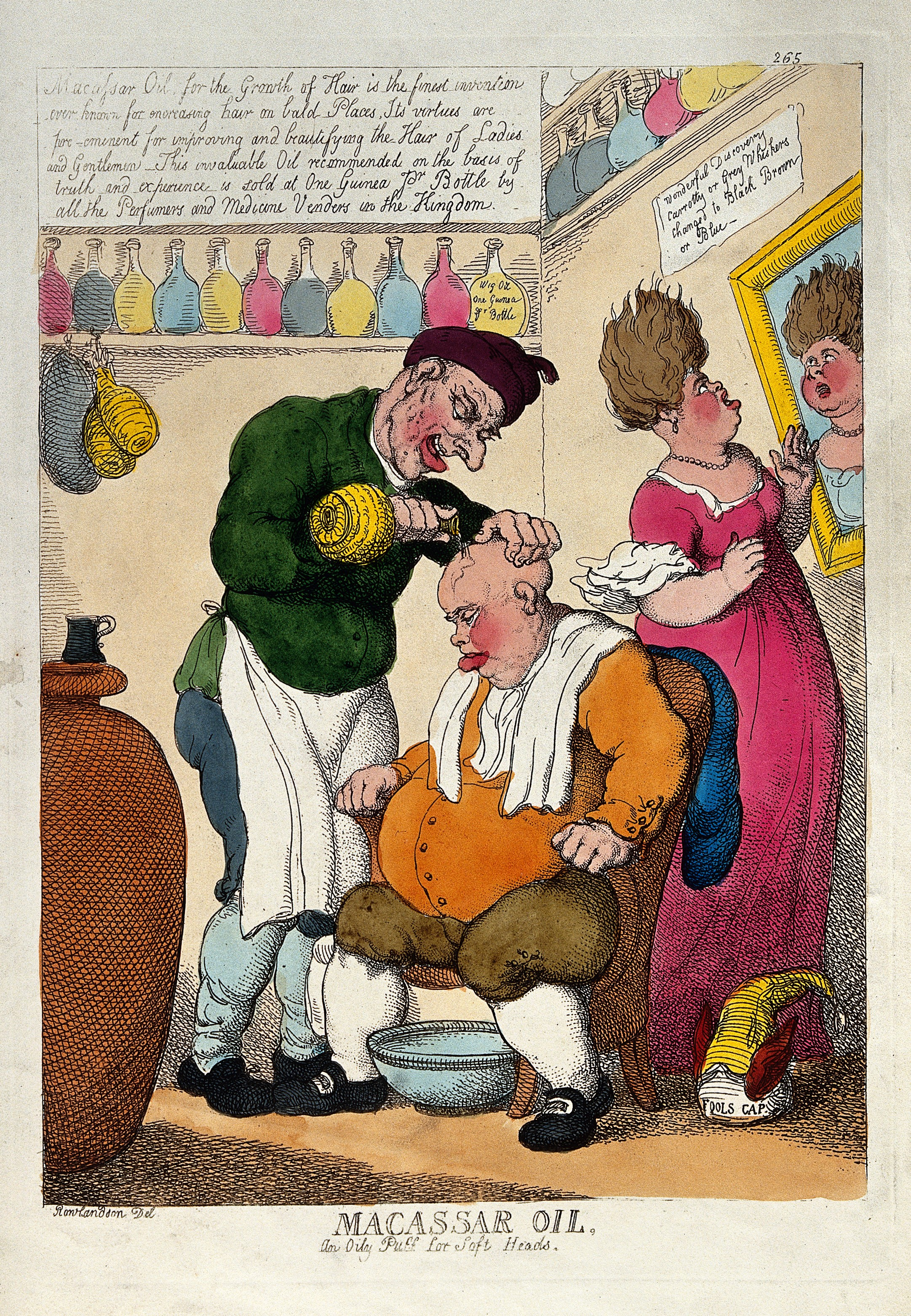
"Macassar oil", from Iconographic Collections c. 1814, lampooning the false claim in some advertisements that Macassar oil would stimulate hair growth on balding men

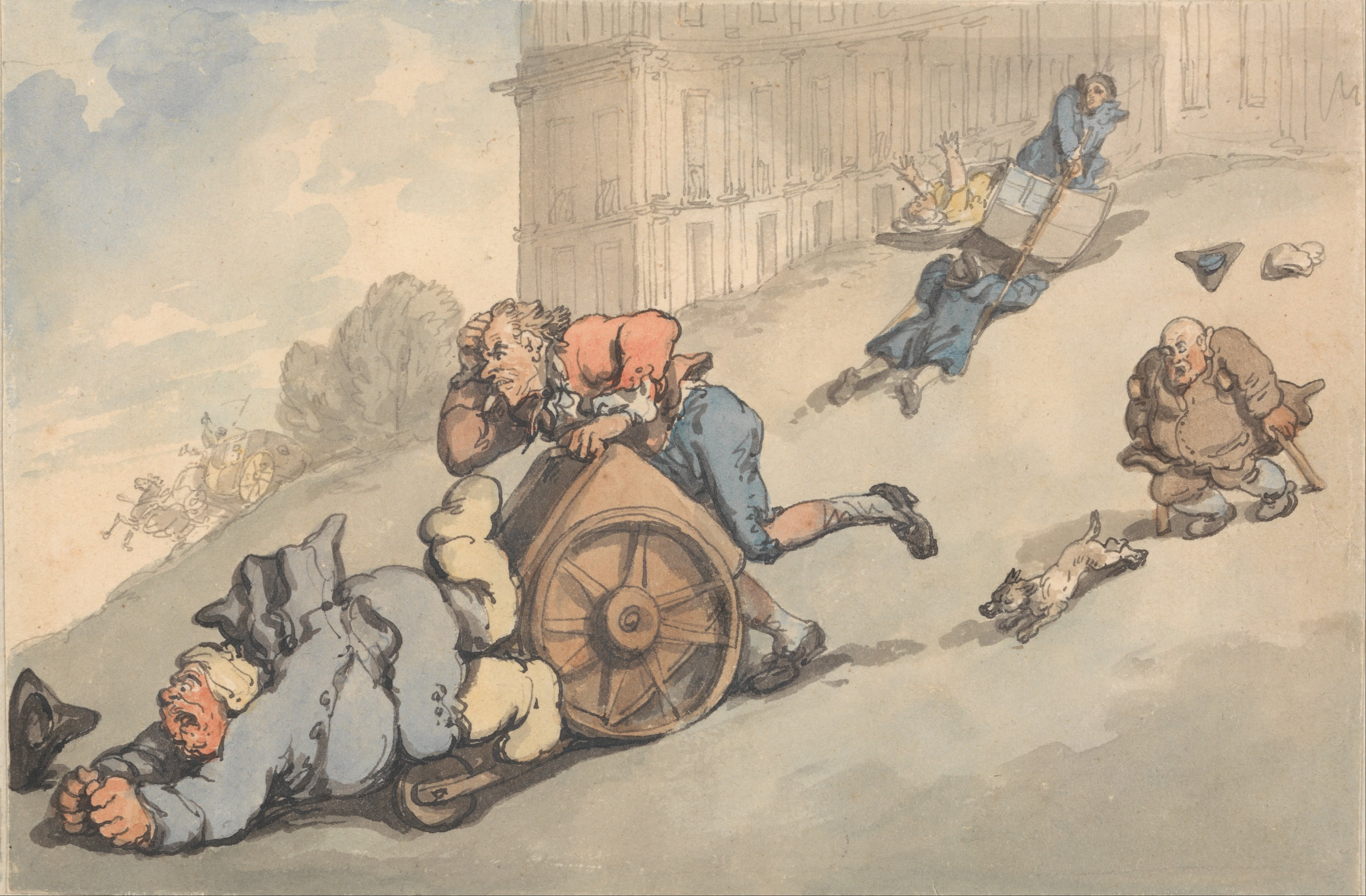
Comforts of Bath, 1798

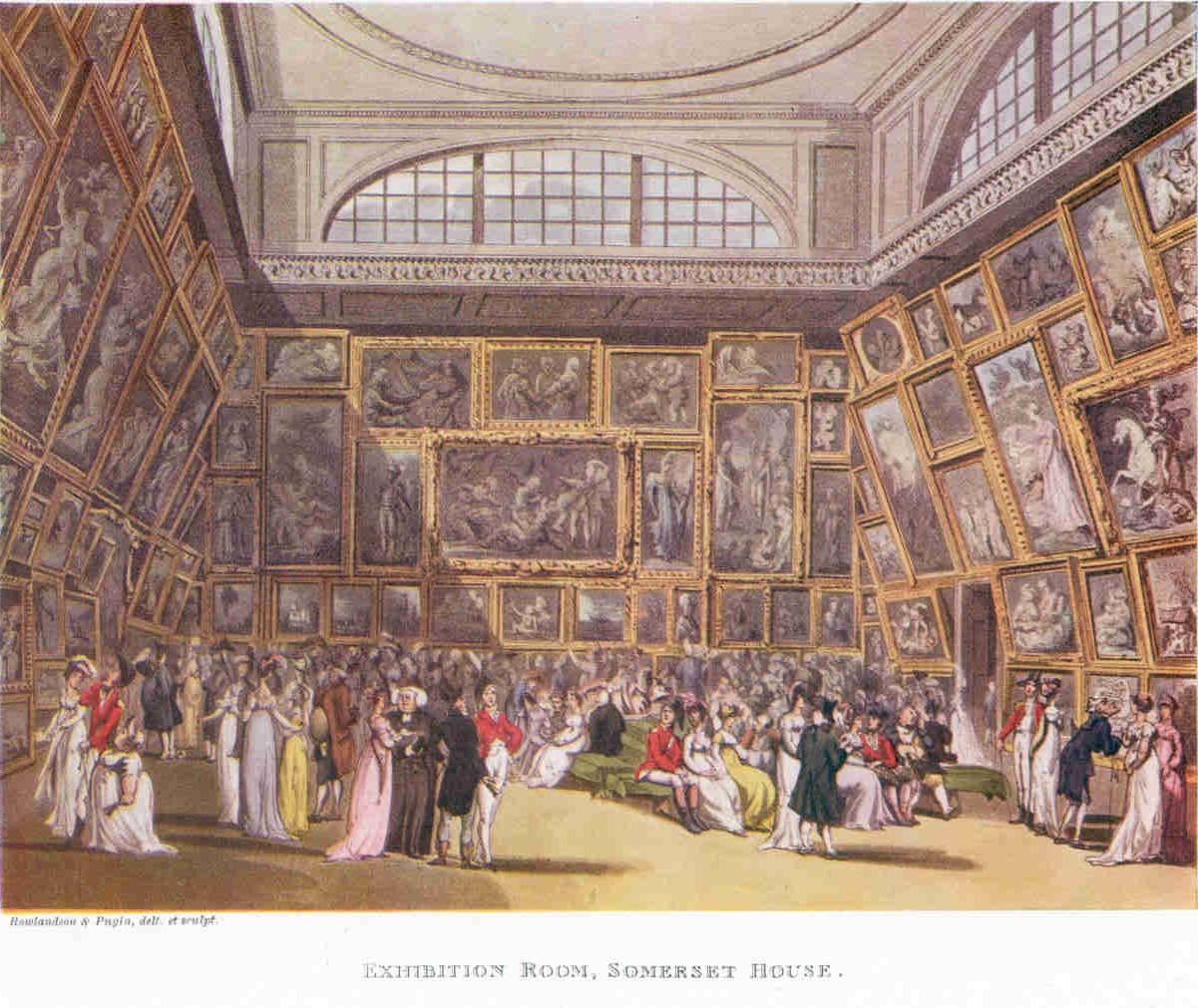
"Exhibition Room, Somerset House", 1800

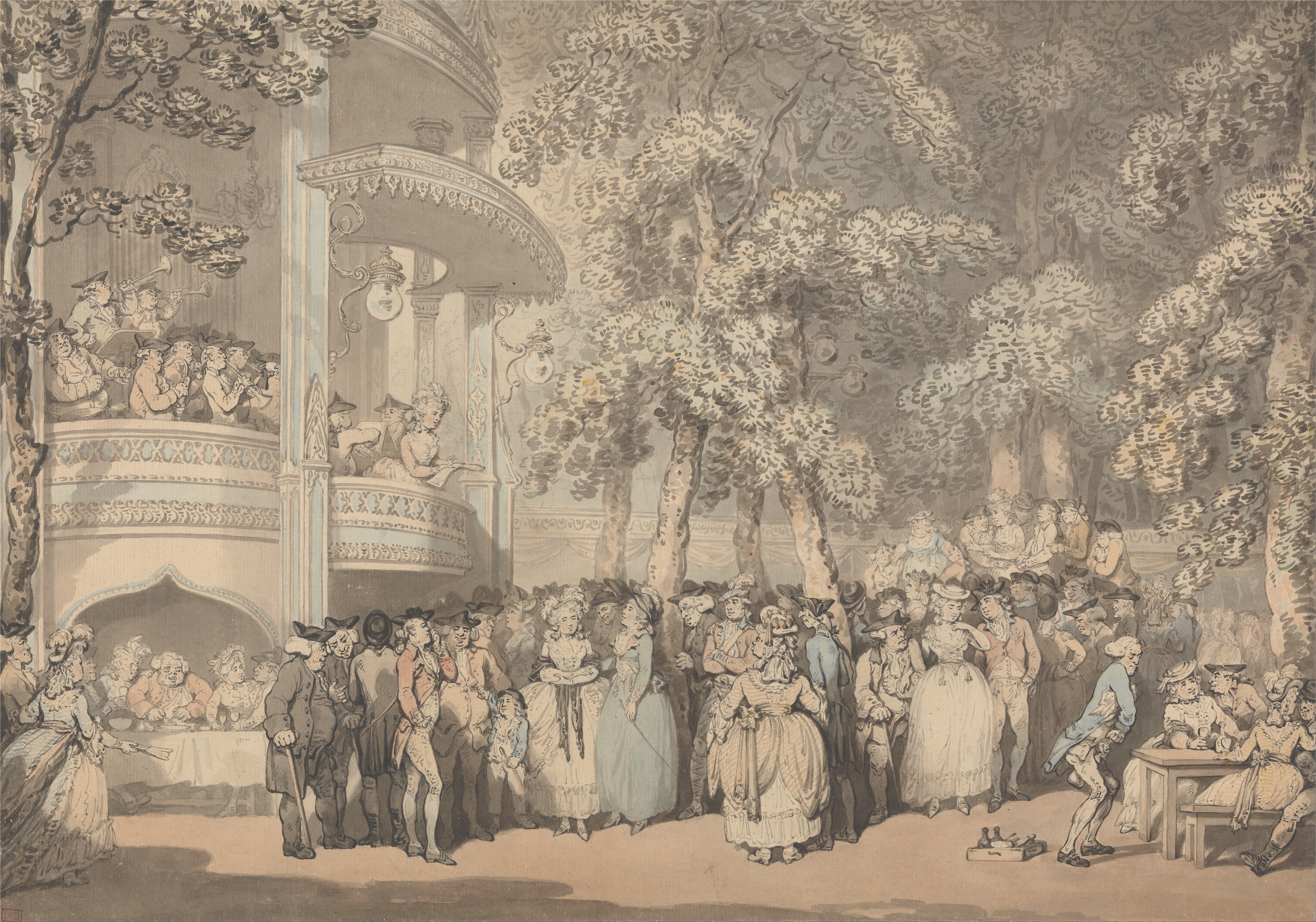
"Vauxhall Gardens", c. 1784

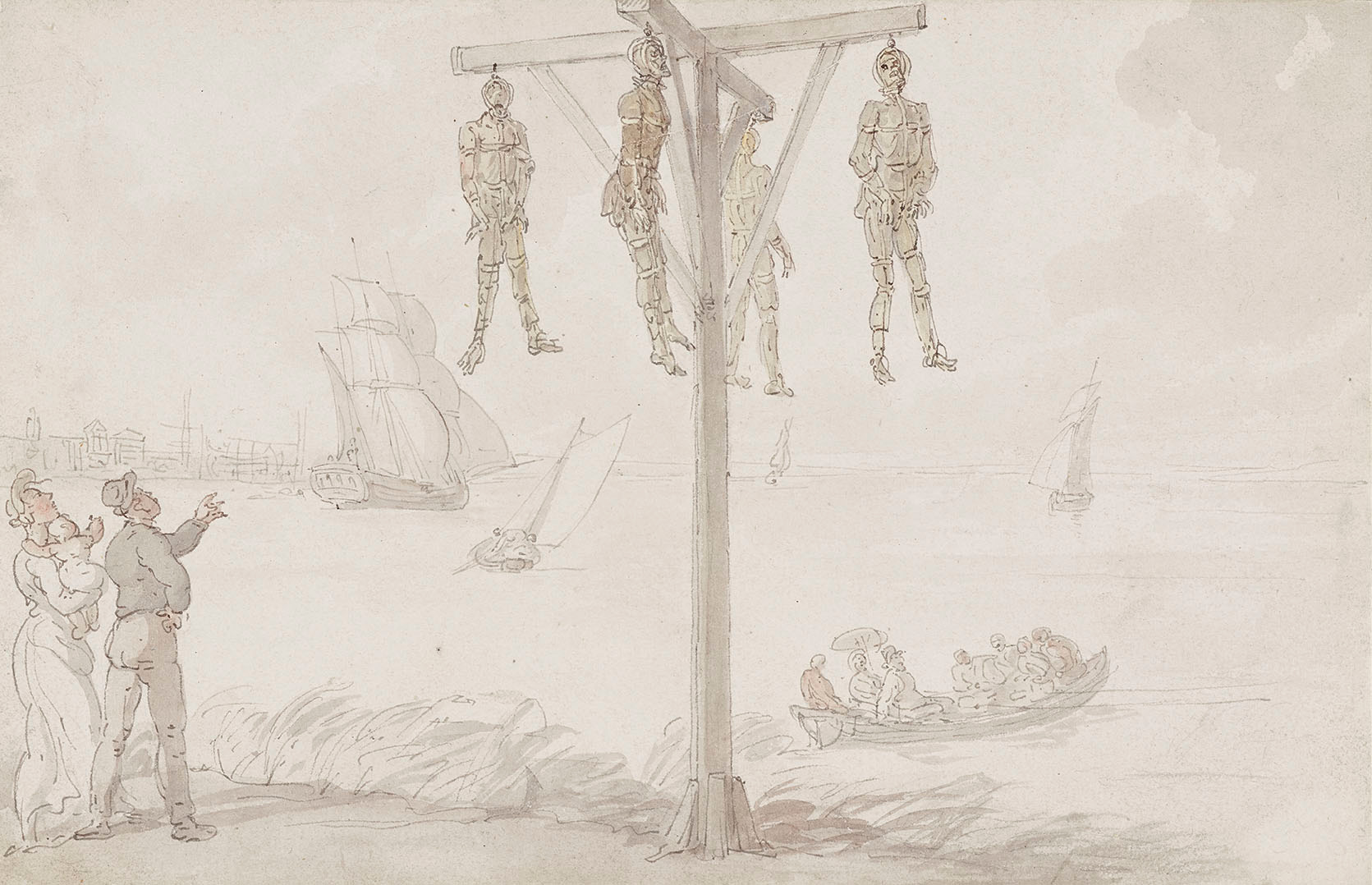
"A Gibbet on the River Thames", c. 1790

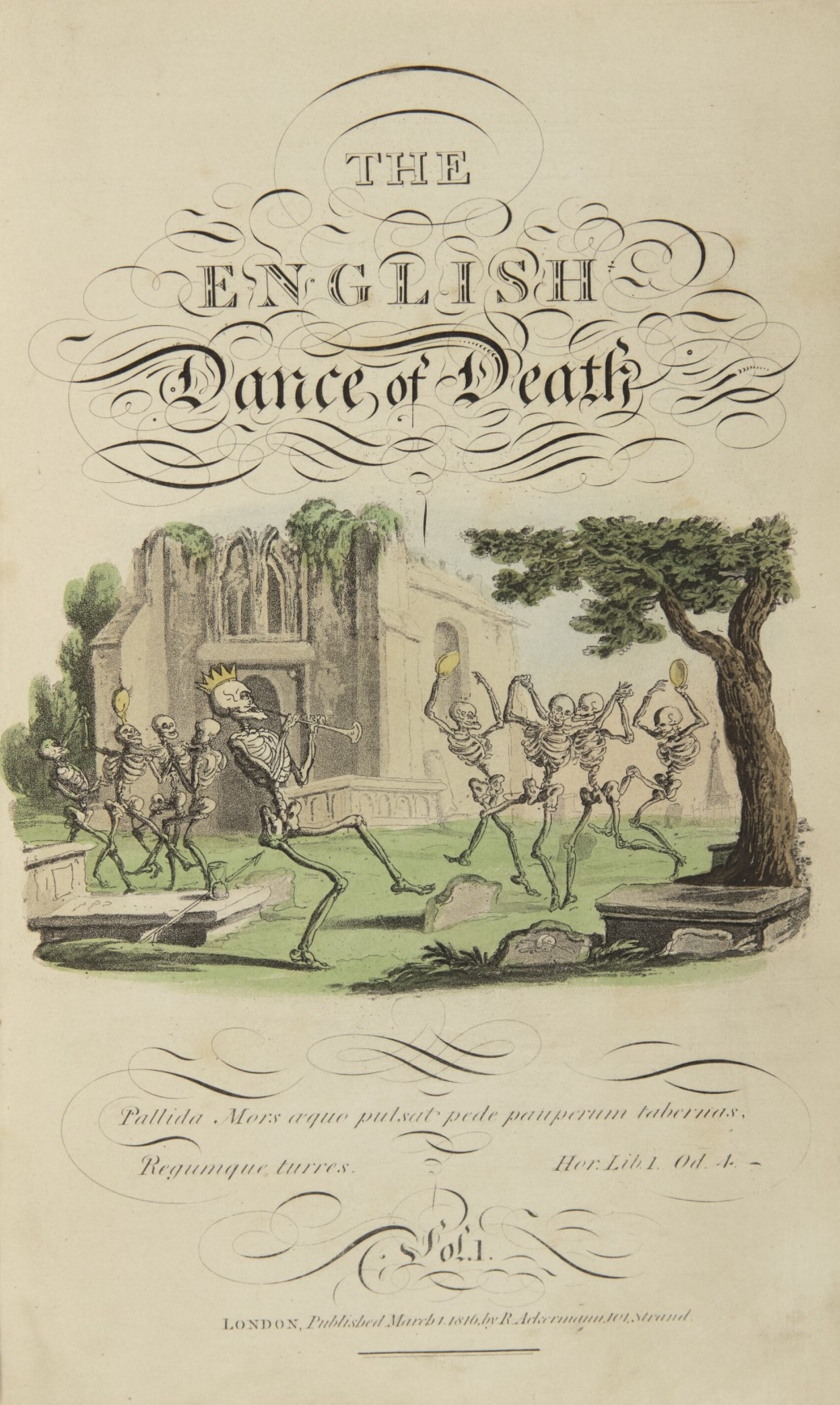
Frontispiece to The English Dance of Death (1816)

== See also ==
- List of erotica by Thomas Rowlandson

== Sources ==
- British Museum, London
- Thomas Rowlandson at the Victoria and Albert Museum
- Lewis Walpole Collection Yale
- Chris Beetles
- University of Liege
- Catalogue of Political and Personal Satires Preserved in the Department of Prints and Drawings in the British Museum, Mary Dorothy George. Vol VI 1938, Vol VII, 1942 VOL VIII 1947, VOL IX 1949
- Dictionary of British Cartoonists and caricaturists 1730–1980 Bryant and Heneage, Scolar Press 1994
- Rudolph Ackermann (1808), Microcosm of London, Illustrated by Augustus Charles Pugin and Thomas Rowlandson. 1904 reprint + Illustrations
