= A Sentimental Journey Through France and Italy =

1768 novel by Laurence Sterne

A Sentimental Journey through France and Italy
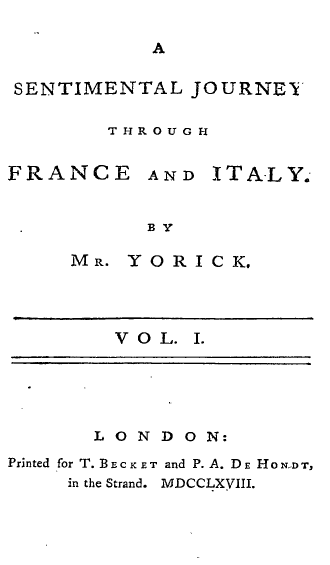
- Title page from Vol. I of the first edition
- Author: Laurence Sterne
- Language: English
- Genre: sentimental novel, travel literature
- Publisher: T. Becket and P. A. De Hondt
- Publication date: 1768
- Publication place: Great Britain
- Media type: Print, 12mo
- Pages: 283, in two volumes
- OCLC: 972051212
- Dewey Decimal: 823.6

A Sentimental Journey Through France and Italy (1768) is a novel by Laurence Sterne. It follows the Reverend Mr. Yorick on a picaresque journey through France, narrated from a sentimental point of view. Yorick is a character from Sterne's bestselling previous novel Tristram Shandy (1759–1767) who also serves as Sterne's alter ego. The novel was planned as a four-volume work, but Sterne died in 1768 with only the first two volumes published; Yorick never makes it to Italy.

The book follows the genre conventions of a travel narrative, with a playful and fragmented writing style. A key theme is the interconnected nature of sympathy and sexual desire, which both inspire strong pro-social feelings. Analysis of the book often seeks to answer whether its depictions of extreme emotion are meant to be serious, or whether Yorick is an unreliable narrator intended to mock the eighteenth-century culture of sensibility.

At its first publication, A Sentimental Journey was widely praised for being more emotionally moving and less bawdy than Tristram Shandy. In the first decades after his death, A Sentimental Journey was Sterne's most popular work. Victorian readers disapproved more strongly of its sexual content, and its reputation declined. In the twentieth and twenty-first centuries, a rehabilitation of Sterne generated more interest in the novel, though it is often now overshadowed by Tristram Shandy.

== Plot summary ==
Yorick's journey starts in Calais, where he meets a monk who begs for donations to his convent. Yorick initially refuses to give him anything, but later regrets his decision. He and the monk exchange their snuff-boxes as a gesture of friendship. He sees a woman, Madame L—, and is intrigued by her; he will continue to encounter her throughout the novel. Yorick buys a chaise to continue his journey. Yorick then inserts a preface cataloguing different kinds of travellers.

After some time in Calais, the next town he visits is Montreuil, where he hires a servant to accompany him on his journey, a young man named La Fleur. Along the way, they pass a man mourning for his dead ass; Yorick sympathizes with him, but his sympathy is interrupted by his carriage driving away too quickly. They travel through Nampont and Amiens before arriving in Paris.

In Paris, he is distracted by the beauty of a shop girl (grisette) when he asks her for directions to the Opera Comique. After the opera, Yorick is informed that the police inquired for his passport at his hotel. Without a passport at a time when England is at war with France, he risks imprisonment in the Bastille. He sees a starling in a cage, which seems to be repeating the phrase "I can't get out"; he is unable to free it and, dwelling on its captivity, becomes miserable imagining the suffering of a prisoner in the Bastille.

Yorick travels to Versailles to acquire a passport, and visits the Count de B****. When Yorick notices the count reads Hamlet, he points with his finger at Yorick's name, mentioning that he is Yorick. The count mistakes him for the king's jester and quickly procures him a passport. Yorick attempts to correct the count, fails, and remains satisfied with receiving his passport so quickly.

Yorick returns to Paris and stays a few more days before continuing his voyage to Italy. He visits Maria—who was introduced in Sterne's previous novel, Tristram Shandy—in Moulins. Maria's mother tells Yorick that Maria has been struck with grief since her husband died. Yorick consoles Maria, and then leaves.

After having passed Lyon during his journey, Yorick spends the night in a roadside inn. The novel ends abruptly in the middle of a scene, with a double entendre.

== Composition and publication ==
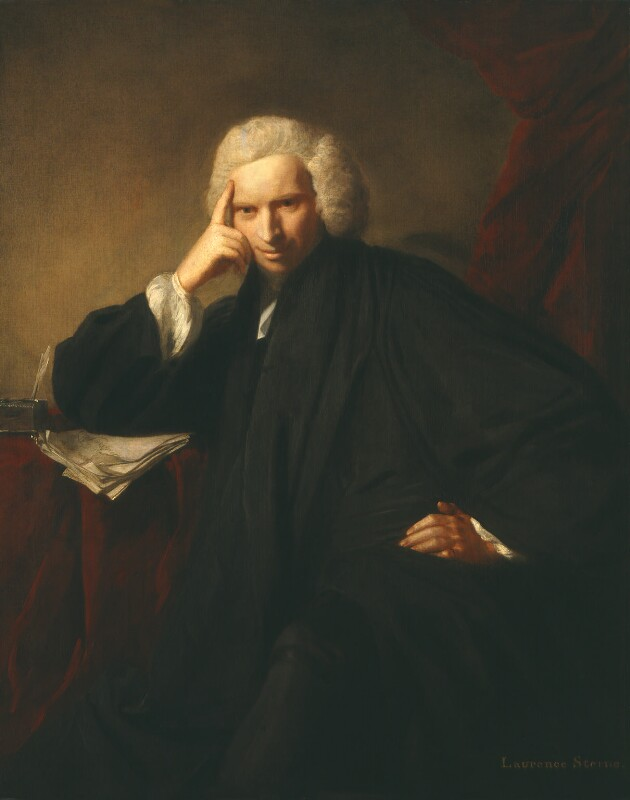
Portrait of Laurence Sterne painted by Joshua Reynolds, 1760

=== Development in response to Tristram Shandy ===
A Sentimental Journey was partly written in response to the declining public opinion of Sterne's previous novel, Tristram Shandy, which he had been publishing in instalments since 1762. Tristram Shandy was primarily a comic novel, with some passages of moral sentiments. It was most praised for its sentimentality, with some reviewers suggesting that Sterne was better at writing pathos than humour. As the 1760s went on, the general literary taste also grew more disapproving of lewd content, contributing to the declining appreciation for (and sales of) Tristram Shandy's ongoing instalments. In 1765, Ralph Griffiths reviewed the latest volumes of Tristram Shandy by saying that the public was no longer interested in that novel, directly advising Sterne to begin a new one focused on sentimentality. Griffiths later took credit for the publication of A Sentimental Journey, which he praised.

Concurrently with writing Tristram Shandy, Sterne travelled to Paris in January 1762, before the Seven Years' War ended. He visited France until 1764, followed by a trip through France and Italy from 1765 to 1766. These travels inspired a parodic account of the Grand Tour in volume 7 of Tristram Shandy in 1765. Still inspired, he decided to write a new book which would experiment with the genre of the travel narrative, and revive his literary reputation after the declining sales of Tristram Shandy.

Sterne first mentioned his plans for a new project in the summer of 1766, when he wrote that he would start a new travel-oriented four-volume work after he had finished the ninth volume of Tristram Shandy. That ninth volume was published in January 1767, and he wrote again about his ideas for a travel narrative in a letter to his daughter in February of 1767. Sterne was very ill that spring, but better in the summer. By June 1767, he was working seriously on the novel, with particular efforts in November and December. His illness grew severe again in December. During the process of composition, Sterne frequently exchanged passionate letters with a married woman, Elizabeth Draper. These letters commented on and influenced his novel-writing, and both express intense, frustrated desire. He signed all his letters to her as "Yorick". The letters were later published as Letters from Yorick to Eliza in 1773, and more of his correspondence as Journal to Eliza in 1904.

=== Publication ===
In January 1768, the writing was complete for the first two volumes, and Sterne travelled to London to monitor the printing process. The first two volumes of A Sentimental Journey were published on February 27, 1768. The publication of the book was partly funded through subscriptions and begins with a list of the subscribers' names. Notable subscribers include the Archbishop of York and the Marquis of Rockingham, as well as the famous actor David Garrick. Elizabeth Draper subscribed under the pseudonym "Sterne's Eliza", purchasing three copies. Subscribers had the option of receiving their copy printed on higher-quality paper. The book ends with a tipped-in page promising subscribers that they will receive the final two volumes the next winter. However, only the first two were published due to Sterne's death in March.

The book went through dozens of editions in the late eighteenth century, indicating substantial sales. The second edition appeared on March 29, 1768—barely a month after the first edition and eleven days after Sterne's death. A Sentimental Journey was rapidly and widely translated on its publication. German and French editions appeared the same year as the English, and by the early 1800s it had been translated into seven other European languages. It was soon published with a variety of annotated critical editions, starting with a 1782 edition which provided a French glossary. It also appeared in pocket-sized editions to be carried on readers' travels. At least fourteen illustrated editions were published between 1768 and 1810, with different illustrators. Later editions include illustrations by Thomas Heath Robinson (1869–1954), Vera Willoughby (1870–1939), Gwen Raverat (1885–1957), and Brian Robb (1913–1979).

== Style ==
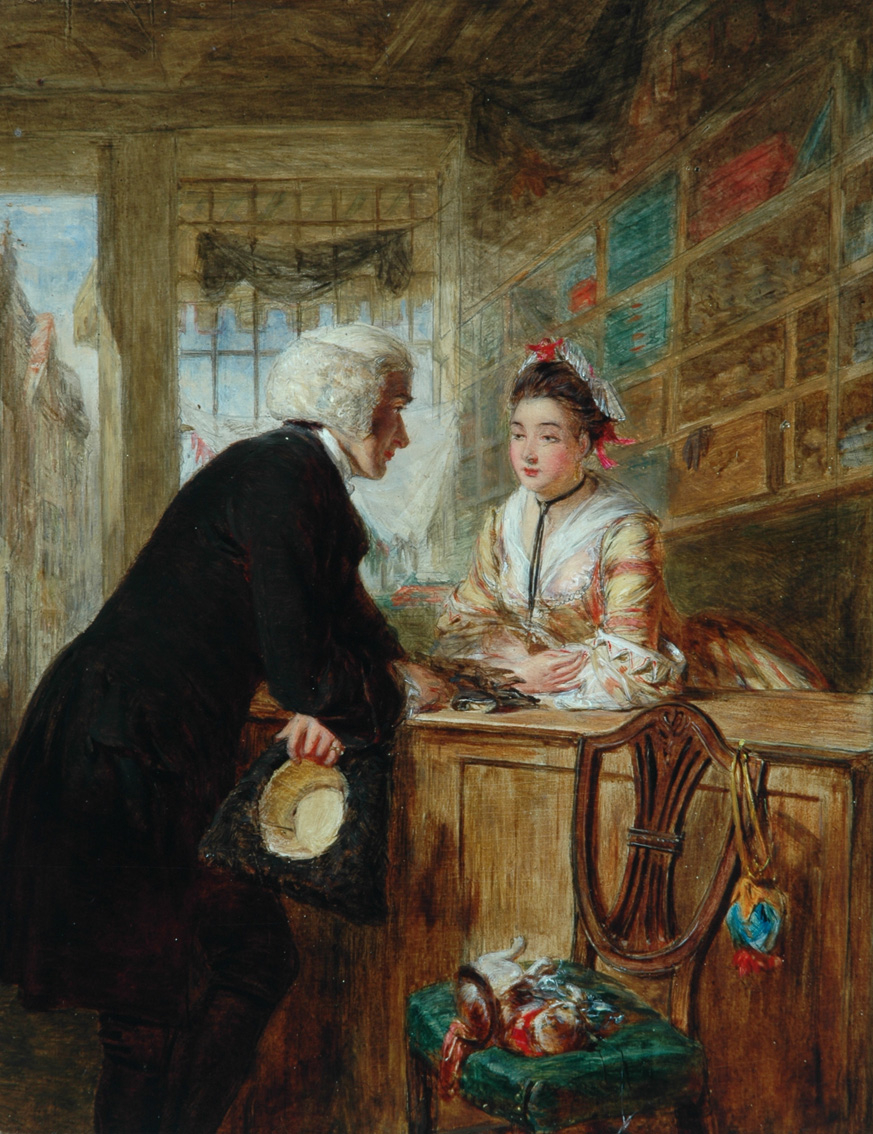
Yorick and the grisette (shop girl), from a sexually-charged comic scene (William Powell Frith, 1853)

=== Playful and fragmented language ===
The language of A Sentimental Journey is playful, with an interest in puns, especially sexual double entendres. The final line of the novel — which suggests grabbing a woman's "end" through the well-timed paratextual note indicating the end of the volume — illustrates the linguistic and metatextual playfulness of the book, and its allusive approach to sexuality. Through aposiopesis, Sterne often abandons a sentence or a narrative at a key moment, leaving the reader to fill in the blanks as to what should follow. Sterne suggested that this narrative technique put the reader at fault for any salacious interpretations of his text, writing: "If it is not thought a chaste book, mercy on them that read it, for they must have warm imaginations, indeed!" The novel is particularly likely to leave an obvious blank, with a word or phrase censored through asterisks or dashes, when the topic is sex or death.

Structurally, the novel is picaresque in its meandering series of disconnected adventures on the road. It is also quixotic in its hero's over-attachment to a misguided ideal (namely, fashionable sensibility). The novel moves between tableaux-like scenes with little information about the links between them, often omitting explanations of how Yorick actually travelled along his journey. The modernist writer Virginia Woolf, praising Sterne's writing as a precursor to the narrative technique of stream of consciousness, wrote: "He was travelling in France indeed, but the road was often through his own mind, and his chief adventures were not with brigands and precipices but with the emotions of his own heart."

=== Genre of travel writing ===
At its publication, A Sentimental Journey was reviewed as a travel narrative rather than a novel, and well-received in reviews for its fresh contributions to that genre. In the 1760s, travel writing was a popular literary genre, more respected than the novel. Travel writing was also undergoing a popularizing shift, as older travel narratives like Joseph Addison's Remarks on several parts of Italy, &c. were regarded as overly focused on classical scholarship, which was uninteresting and inaccessible to middle-class audiences. Travel narratives were rarely written by the small elite of aristocratic young men who went on a formal Grand Tour; instead, they were written by more middle-class travellers, whose journeys might have practical motivation. To better entertain their readers, travel writers began to emphasize personal anecdotes over scholarship or practical guidebook catalogues, and each writer sought to cultivate a distinctive narrative voice. Many stylistic aspects of A Sentimental Journey take these trends to their logical extreme. In both Tristram Shandy and A Sentimental Journey, Sterne promotes the idea that travel (and travel writing) should prioritize social connection rather than formulaic sight-seeing. A Sentimental Journey can also be seen as an answer to Tobias Smollett's decidedly unsentimental Travels Through France and Italy. Sterne had met Smollett during his travels in Europe, and strongly objected to his spleen, acerbity and quarrelsomeness. He modelled the character of Smelfungus on Smollett.

A structural feature taken from travel writing is the organization of the work into chapters named after the characters' location, rather than numbered sequentially. A new chapter begins each time there is a change of scenery, even if Yorick remains in the same city, such that the chapters describe the boundaries of individual narrative tableaux. Reinforcing this connection, the chapter titles usually add a short description of the key event in the scene. A 1768 review in the Critical Review describes the use of "whimsical titles" for the chapters as an "imitation of some celebrated authors".

=== Fictionalized autobiography ===
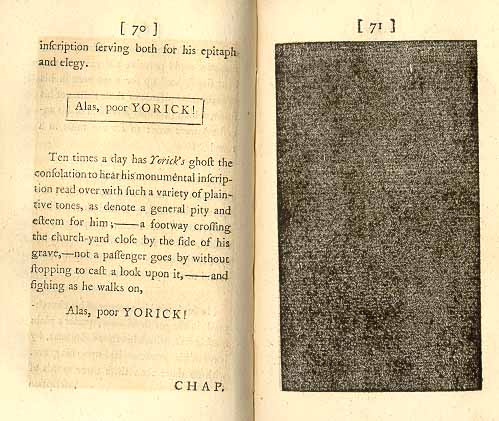
Tristram Shandy's account of Yorick's death (1761)

A Sentimental Journey describes locations Sterne visited on his own travels, but the title page of A Sentimental Journey identifies the narrative as "by Mr. Yorick." In Tristram Shandy, Parson Yorick is a minor character with a melodramatically tragic story: he is rejected by the church for his sense of humour, and dies in poverty. The novel mourns him by presenting his epitaph ("Alas, poor YORICK!") and printing a page of solid black. Parson Yorick's unsuccessful clerical career mirrored Sterne's provincial obscurity as a clergyman before Tristram Shandy, and Sterne was often publicly identified with Yorick. Sterne published a collection of his own sermons under the title The Sermons of Mr. Yorick, with two volumes in 1760 and two more in 1766. Publishing A Sentimental Journey under Yorick's name primed readers to expect the character's lighthearted but fundamentally moral perspective. It also encouraged them to see Sterne himself as more like Yorick than the morally questionable character of Tristram Shandy, which would improve Sterne's shaky reputation.

== Analysis ==
=== Sexual desire as pro-social ===
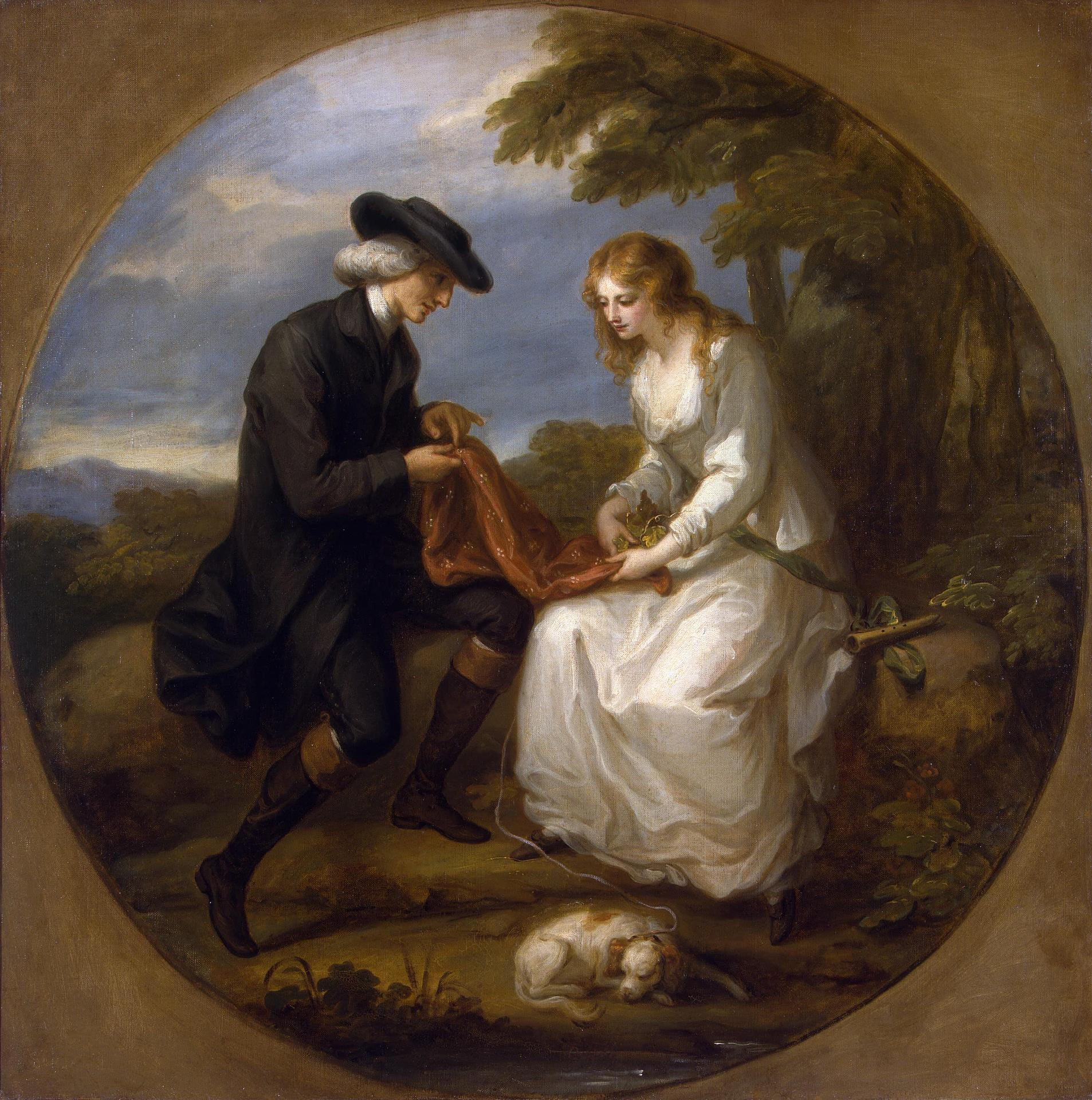
Yorick comforting "Poor Maria", painted by Angelica Kauffmann

Although A Sentimental Journey was considered less lewd than Sterne's previous novel, it is still characterized by frequent sexualized wordplay and events. The novel does not treat sexual desire as incompatible with spiritual faith or moral goodness; instead, it suggests that desire is one way of encouraging people toward the pro-social qualities of friendliness and generosity. Several of Sterne's sermons present the idea that desire is granted to people by God, and that properly directed desire promotes social harmony. One of these sermons, "The Levite and his Concubine", is directly reworked in A Sentimental Journey.

The interconnectedness of sympathy, sexual desire, and spirituality is particularly seen in Yorick's meeting with the peasant Maria. Yorick seeks out the young and attractive Maria while she is alone in the countryside, mourning her lost husband; he finds her in tears, and is moved to tears himself. He uses his handkerchief to dry her eyes, and then his own, and then hers, and then his. In this moment, he "felt such undescribable emotions within" that he writes, "I am positive I have a soul," rejecting the materialist view that sees all human behaviour as "combinations of matter and motion." This scene is often seen as sexually suggestive, particularly in Yorick's 'undescribable emotions'. The scene is also sometimes seen as hyperbolic, calling Yorick's leap of logic into question. However, in the context of eighteenth-century philosophic discourses, both tears and sexual desire can be understood as proof of an immaterial soul, because emotion is also immaterial.

=== Potential for satire ===
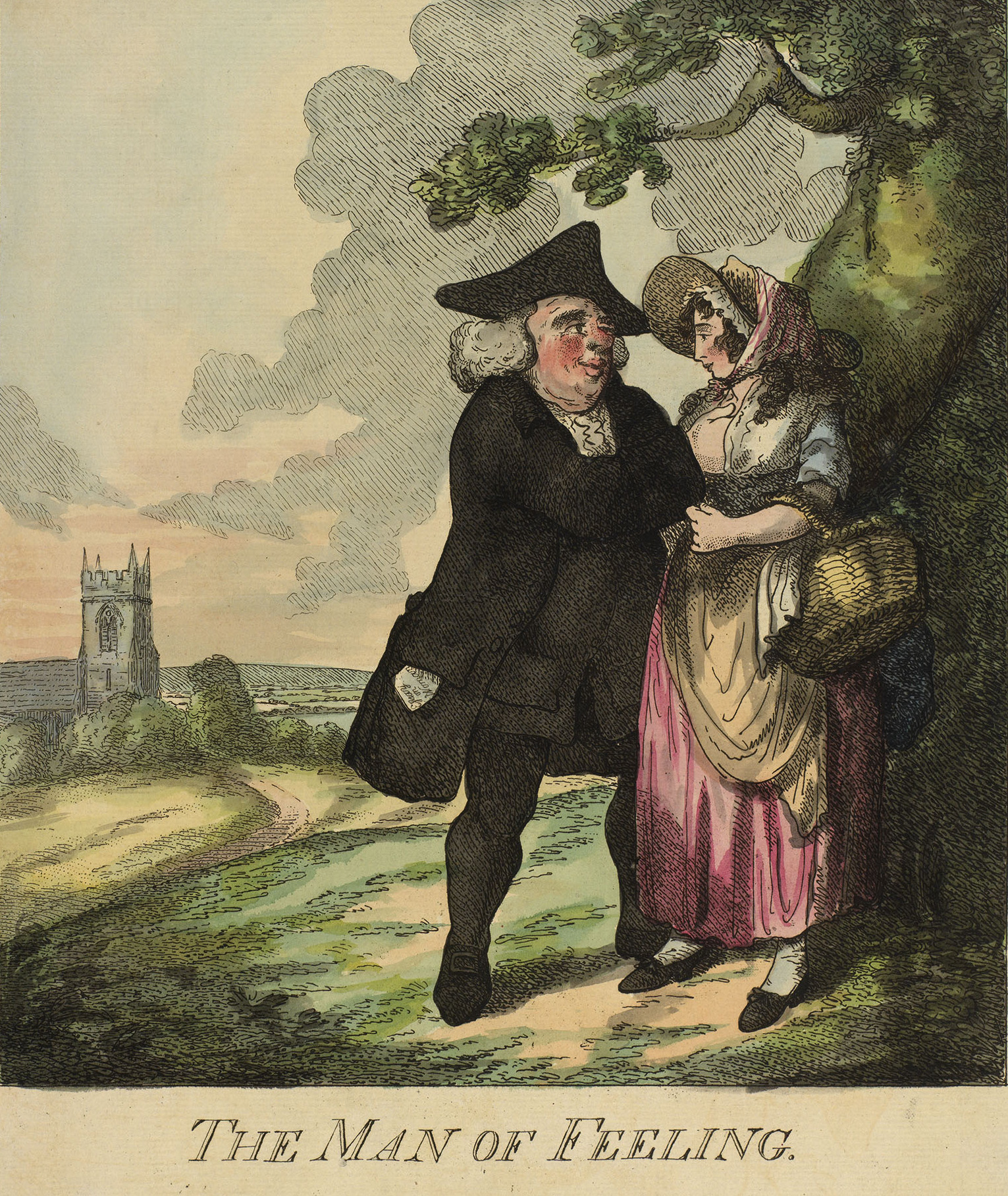
A satirical print by Thomas Rowlandson, in which a "man of feeling" in a clerical outfit feels a woman's breast

Sterne often presented the novel as one with a serious moral purpose, calling it his "Work of Redemption", and writing to a friend that the book would "teach us to love the world and our fellow creatures better than we do." However, even in Sterne's day, readers have questioned the moral value of sentimental emotion. Eighteenth-century sceptics of the sentimental movement particularly criticized the shallowness of moments where Yorick expresses emotion but takes no action. In 1789, A Sentimental Journey was parodied by the anonymous novel A Man of Failing, which also targeted Henry Mackenzie's The Man of Feeling.

Several twentieth-century scholars have argued that Yorick's feelings and religious expressions are intentionally excessive, and that he ought to be read as an unreliable narrator. In this reading, the novel constitutes a critique of sentimentalists like Yorick who express ostentatious feelings of sympathy without concretely assisting those in distress. One scholar, Rufus Putney, describes the novel as "a hoax by which Sterne persuaded his contemporaries that the humor he wanted to write was the pathos they wanted to read." Thomas Keymer argues in The Cambridge Companion to Laurence Sterne that the novel is best understood as offering the reader both options, serious or satirical, depending on their tastes.

=== Attitude toward France ===
Sterne's observations about French society were markedly less xenophobic than many English travel writers at the time. The war between France and Britain often prompted patriotic and nationalistic discourses about Britain's superiority. It was also conventional for the travel writer to comment on their homesickness for their home country as the best country, which Yorick entirely avoids doing.

One indication that Sterne's attitude to France was more generous than that of his audience lies in the annotations of an unknown eighteenth-century reader. This reader added comments in the margins of their copy of the first edition, expressing their conviction that France was naturally plagued with poverty due to its absolutist and Catholic government. For example, when Yorick is in Paris this reader's annotations contrast Paris and London, "one a place of total gaiety & dissipation the other of industry & business".

== Reception ==
=== Eighteenth-century response ===
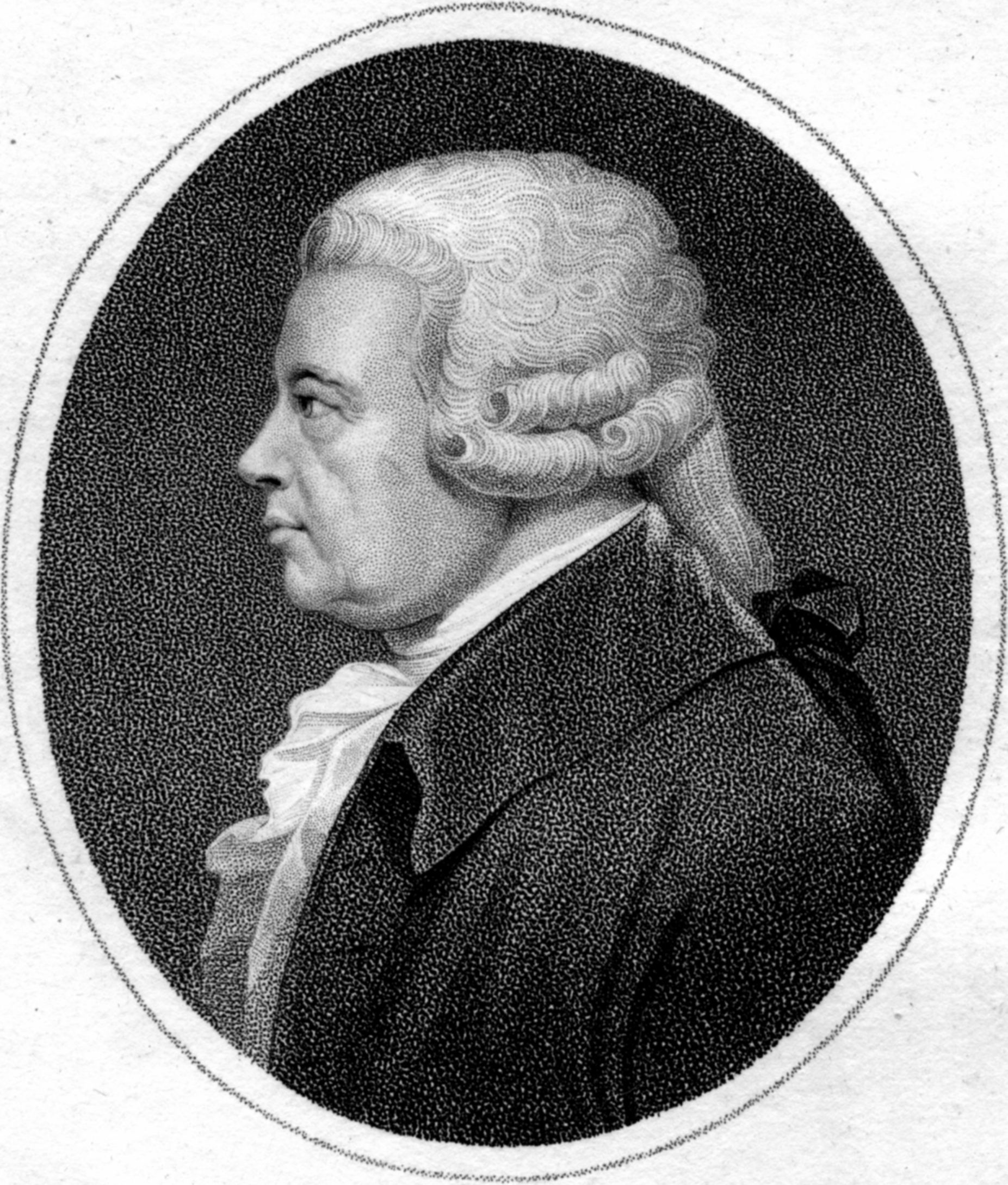
Ralph Griffiths, editor of The Monthly Review, praised the book's emphasis on moral sentiment

At the novel's publication in 1768, reviewers considered A Sentimental Journey to be an improvement over the recent volumes of Tristram Shandy, and praised Sterne's change of focus from humour to sentimentality. Eighteenth-century readers also preferred it because it was less obviously sexual. The Monthly Review referred to it as his "best production", and said, "the highest excellence of this genuine, this legitimate son of humour, lies not in his humorous but in his pathetic vein." The Political Register wrote, "Justly esteemed the best of the late Mr. Sterne's ingenious performances. To that original vein of humour which was so natural to him ... he has here added the moral and the pathetic; so that even while he is entertaining (as he always is) we are agreeably instructed." Reflecting this general taste, the author Horace Walpole described it as "infinitely preferable to his tiresome Tristram Shandy" due to its "great good nature and delicacy," which appeals better to the "heart of sensibility." More negative was The Critical Review, which complains that the book is "calculated to instruct young travellers in what the author meant for the bon ton of pleasure and licentiousness."

A Sentimental Journey continued to be considered Sterne's best and most beloved work from Sterne's death through the early nineteenth century, and it was more widely reprinted than Tristram Shandy. Its positive reputation was particularly promoted by the volume of extracts, The Beauties of Sterne, which was compiled by the print seller and publisher William Holland in 1782. This anthology included many passages praised for their emotional power. The Beauties of Sterne went through twelve editions in ten years.

In addition to the professional commentary of reviewers, the eighteenth-century response to the novel can also be found in an annotated first edition of A Sentimental Journey. This unknown reader wrote their assessment at the bottom of the first page of the novel: "Stern was certainly a most elastic genious, by his sudden trancisions from one extreme to the other, not allways to his advantage, from starts or sally's most sublime and elevated down to the most gross and beastly unpardonably as if he feard to be to highly admired." They object to the sentimental scene of the dead ass as "forced & unnatural", and they censor many of the novel's lewdest jokes. To express their disapproval of the chapters "The Rose" and "The Passport", they initially glued several pages together to render them unreadable, then pried them open and blacked out the objectionable paragraphs line by line.

=== Nineteenth century to present ===
By the mid-nineteenth century, the novel's reception grew more mixed, as Victorian readers were less tolerant of its 'indecencies'. In 1819, the novel was added to the Vatican's list of books prohibited by the Catholic Church. The novelist William Makepeace Thackeray influentially criticized its "corruption" in his 1852 public lectures, though some of his contemporaries resisted this assessment. The literary critic Leslie Stephen also objected to Sterne's double entendres. Despite these criticisms, A Sentimental Journey has never been out of print since its publication.

In the early twentieth century, a new biography of Sterne and a decline in social conservatism prompted a re-evaluation of the novel. It was particularly popular in the 1920s, when more than a dozen new editions were published. Virginia Woolf, a modernist writer, promoted a rejection of Victorian mores through her highly admiring introduction to a 1928 edition of the novel. As others followed suit in embracing Sterne's proto-modernist experimentation with form, A Sentimental Journey was often overshadowed by Tristram Shandy, which attracted more scholarly attention for its more daring experiments in literary form. The first scholarly monograph about A Sentimental Journey was W.B.C. Watkins' Perilous Balance in 1939. Scholarship on the novel began to flourish in the 1960s and 70s. Today, A Sentimental Journey is studied for its role in the broader phenomenon of eighteenth century sensibility.

== Legacy ==
=== Illustrations ===
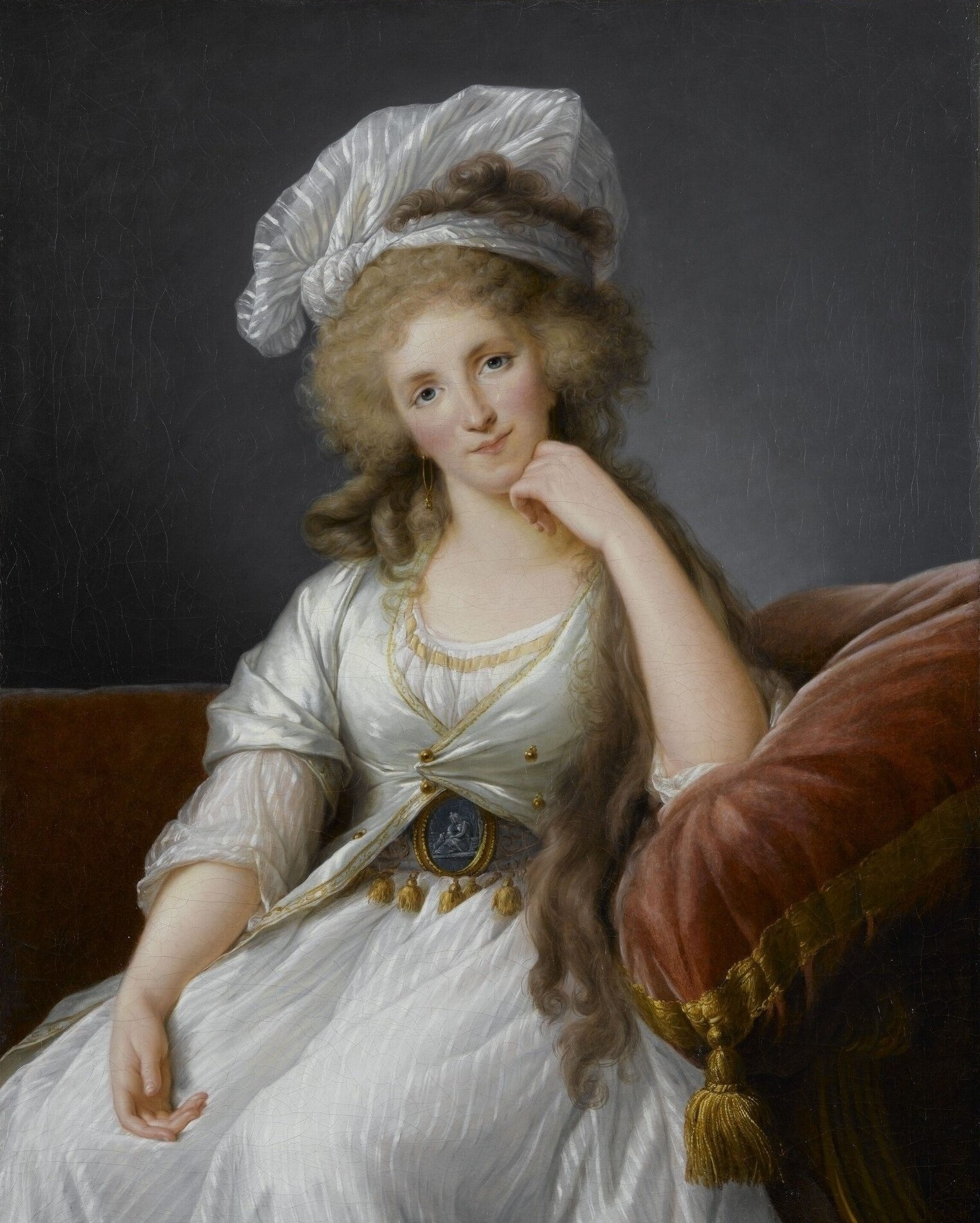
Louise Marie Adélaïde de Bourbon, 1789

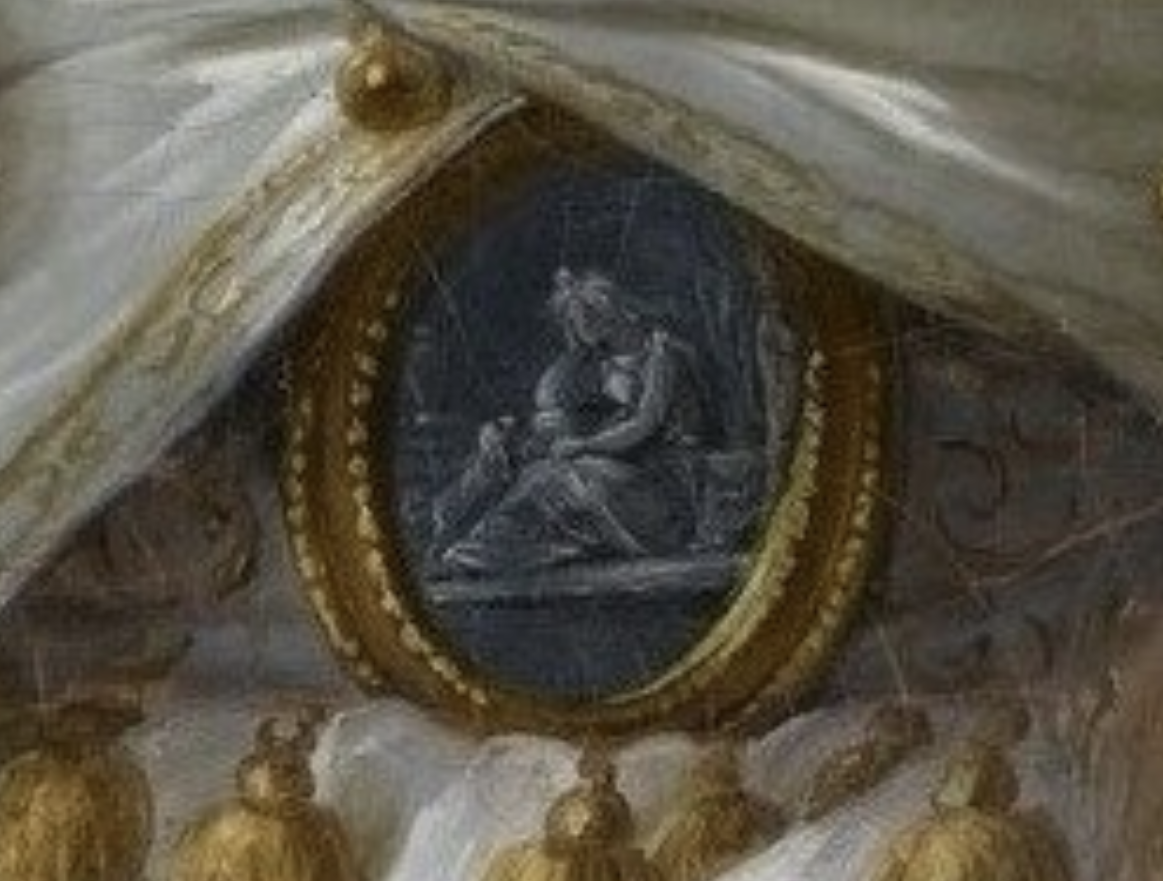
Detail of "Poor Maria" brooch at her waist

A Sentimental Journey inspired a large number of illustrations, in the form of paintings, prints for sale, and decorated merchandise. Images of "Poor Maria" were particularly popular. Angelica Kauffmann, an artist primarily known for her history paintings, painted Poor Maria in 1777, and printed copies were sold throughout Europe. The porcelain company Wedgwood created cameos of a similar "Poor Maria" image (and its companion shepherd portrait, the "Bourbonnais Shepherd") to decorate a wide range of products. This best-selling motif appeared on personal adornments like brooches and shoe buckles, as well as household goods like teaware and vases. In a portrait painted by Élisabeth Vigée Le Brun in 1789, the Duchess of Orléans, Louise Marie Adélaïde de Bourbon, is depicted wearing a "Poor Maria" Wedgwood brooch at her waist. The design was used on jasperware bud vases as late as the 1960s.

Other popular scenes for illustration were Yorick and the grisette, the captive he imagines in the Bastille, the old man and the ass, and the monk of Calais. The monk formed the subject of the first painting based on A Sentimental Journey, exhibited in 1771. Joseph Wright of Derby, best known for his images of the Enlightenment such as A Philosopher Lecturing on the Orrery, made four paintings inspired by the novel: one version of The Captive in 1774, another Captive and a portrait of Maria in 1777, and a second portrait of Maria in 1781.

Illustrations of "Poor Maria"
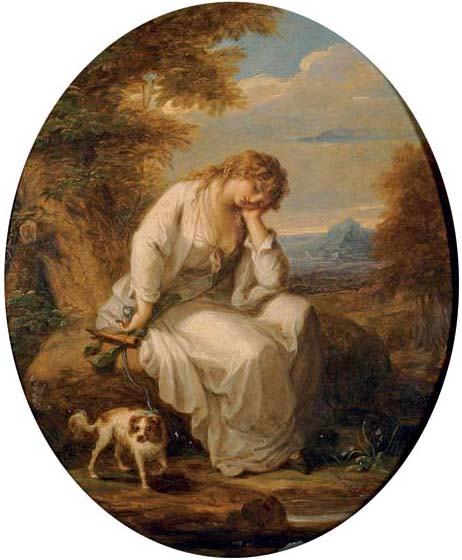
1779, by Angelica Kauffman

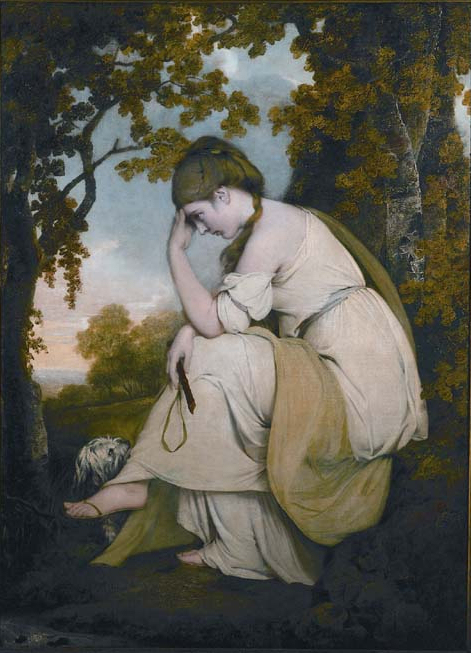
1781, by Joseph Wright of Derby

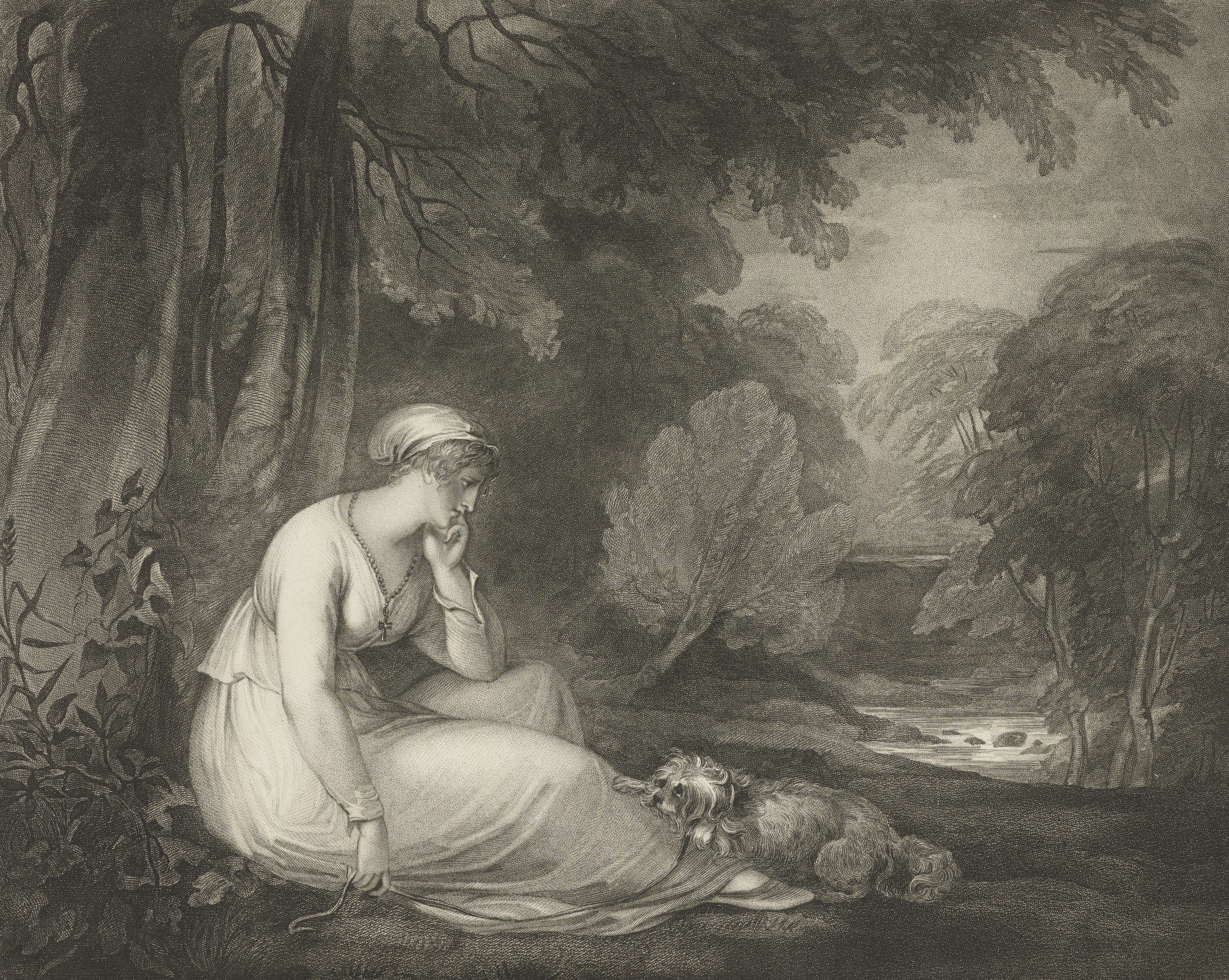
1808, engraving by Edward Orme

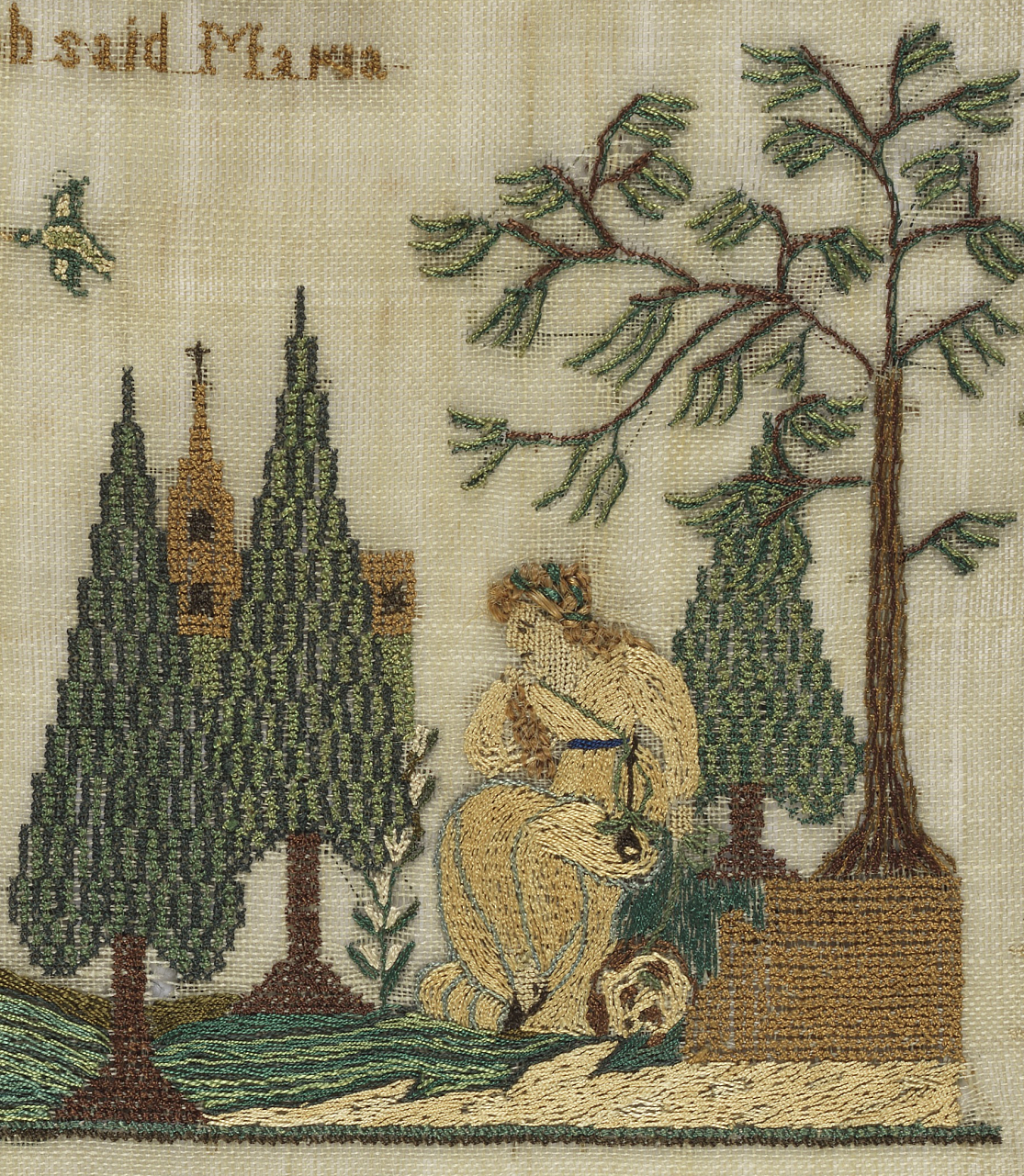
1834, embroidery sampler by Elizabeth Tudor aged 12 years

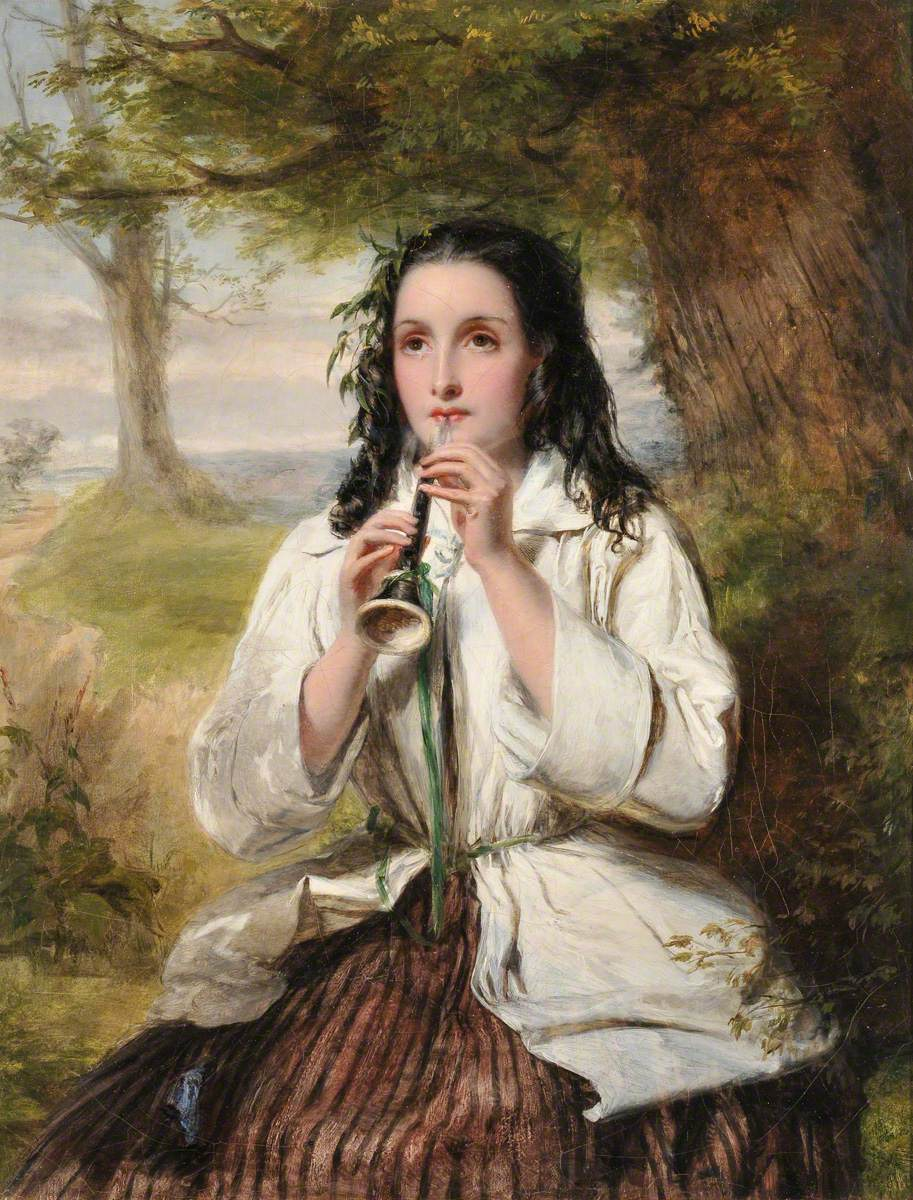
c.1850, by William Powell Frith

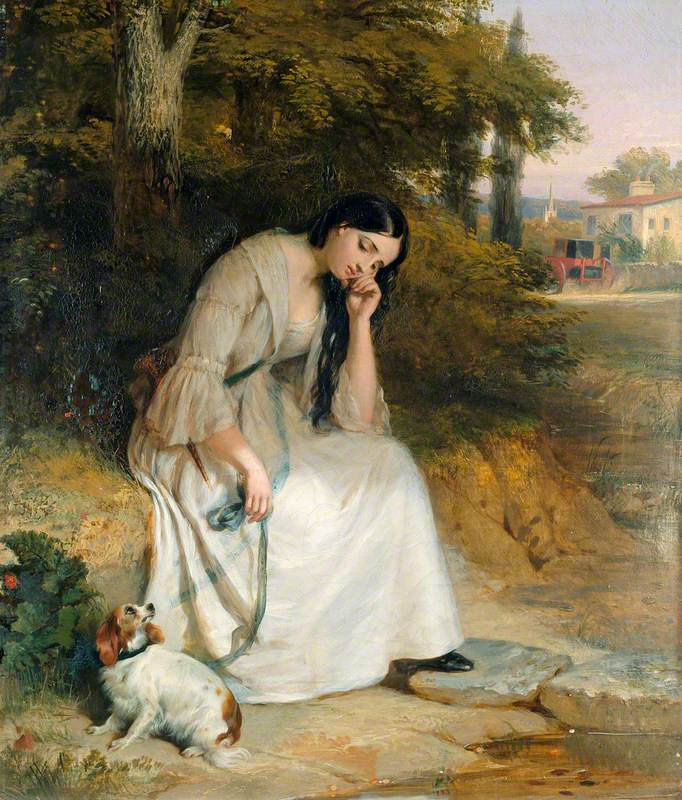
Maria by Charles Landseer, 1836
Illustrations of the captive in the Bastille
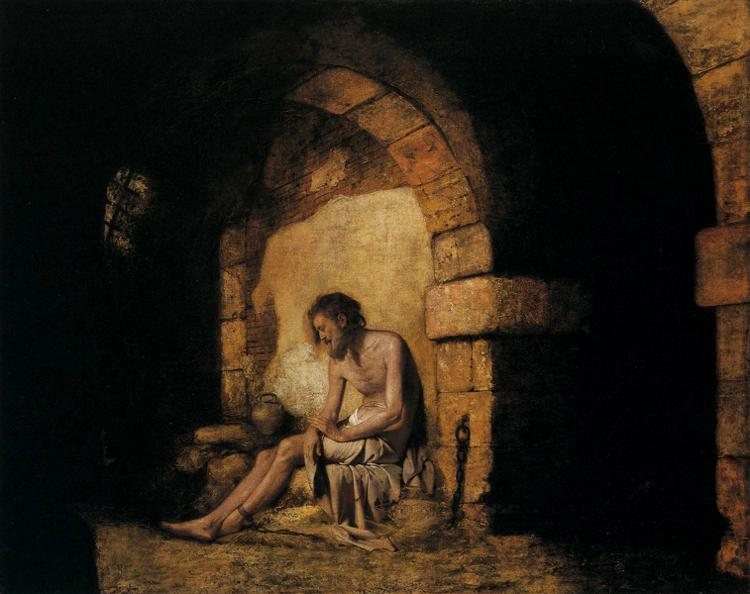
1774, by Joseph Wright of Derby

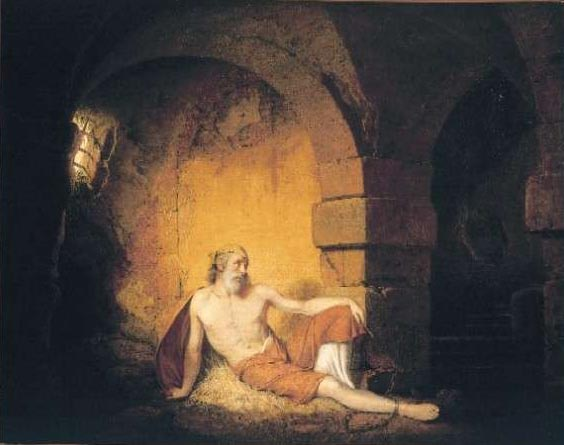
1778, by Joseph Wright of Derby

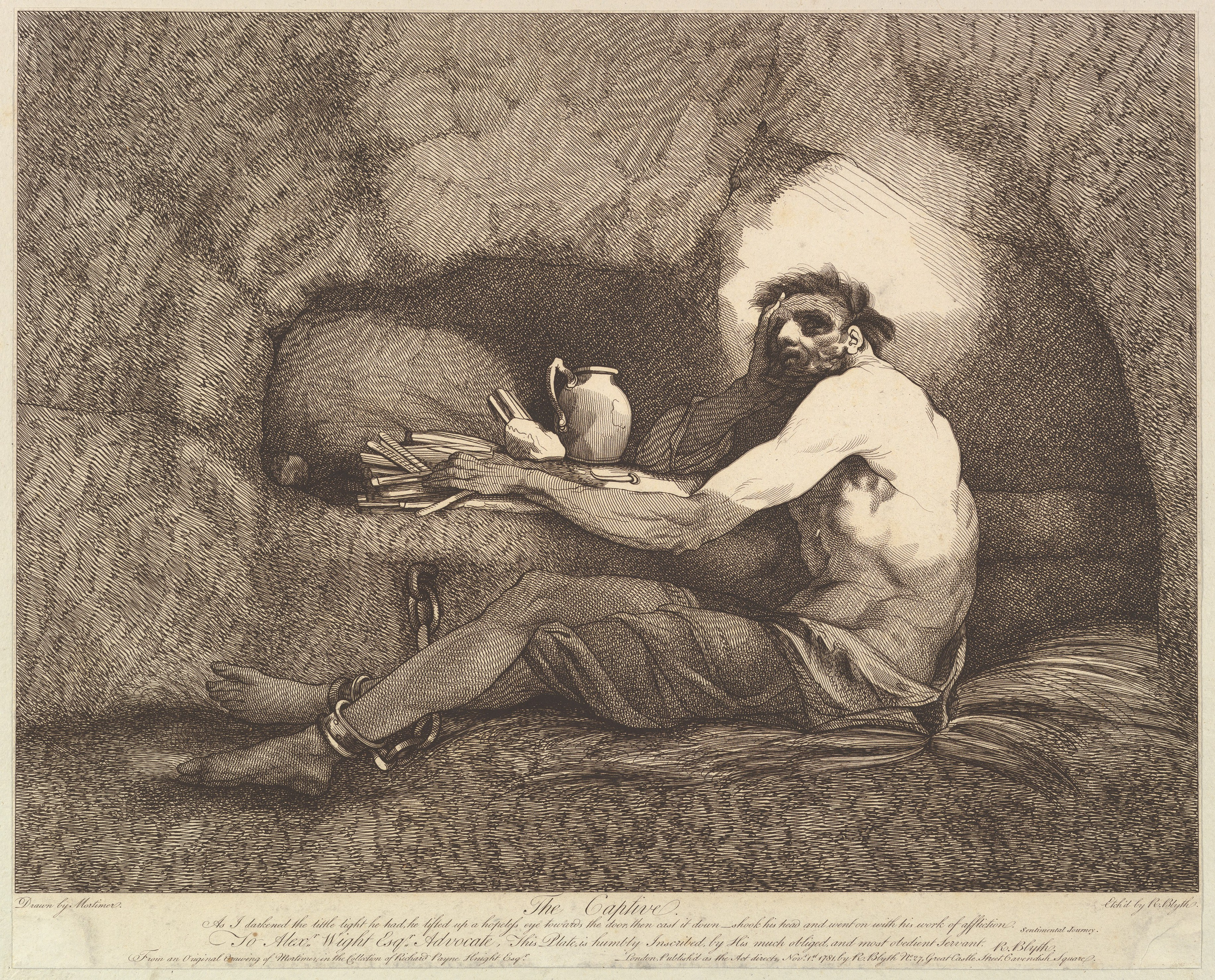
1781, engraved based on a painting by John Hamilton Mortimer

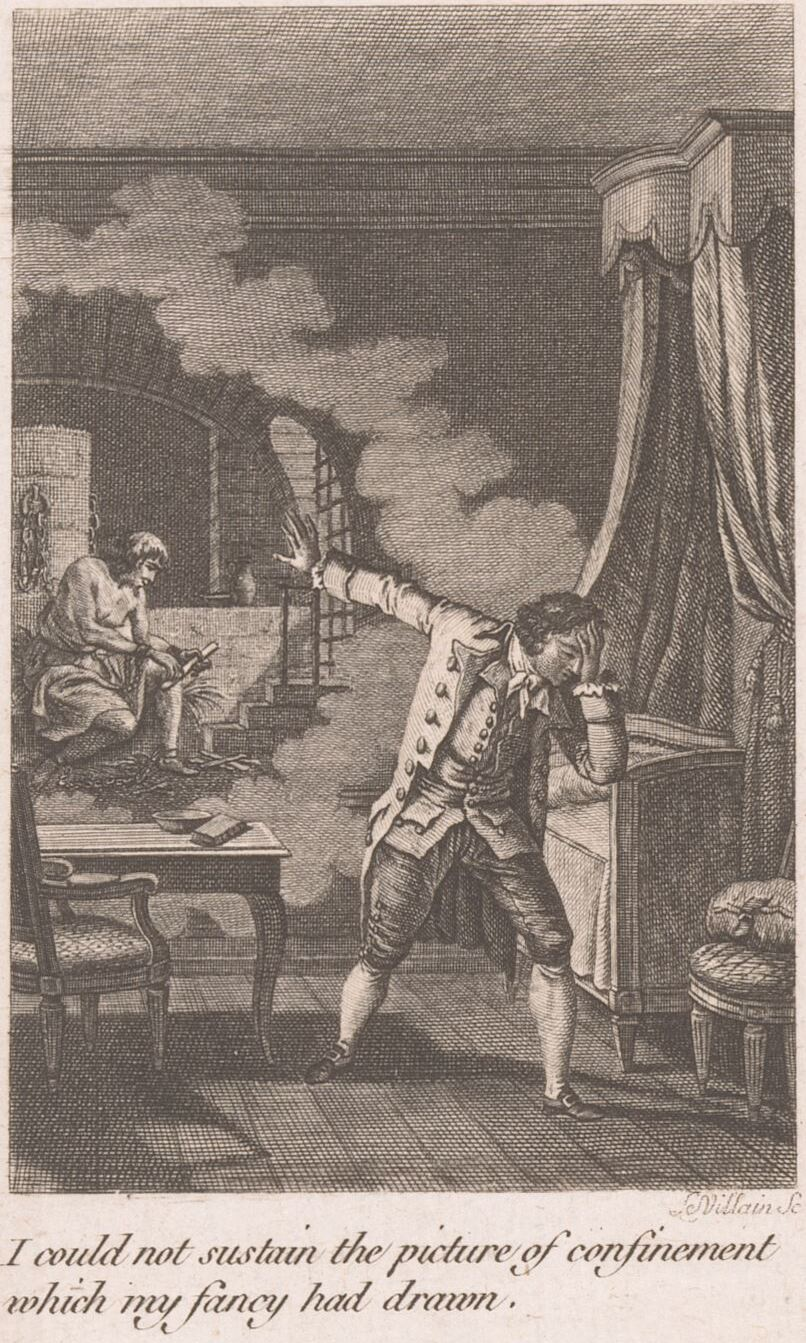
1802, from the French edition

=== Books written in response ===
Beginning in 1769, several "continuations" of A Sentimental Journey were published, many of which claimed to be by Sterne. The best-known continuation claimed to be by Eugenius, a character who appeared in both Tristram Shandy and A Sentimental Journey. It is titled Yorick's Sentimental Journey Continued: To Which Is Prefixed Some Account of the Life and Writings of Mr. Sterne (1769), and was sometimes bound with Sterne's real volumes to produce an apparently complete work. It has often been attributed to Sterne's long-time friend John Hall-Stevenson, who is associated with the character of Eugenius, but that attribution is no longer considered plausible. Another continuation, also published in 1769, "consisted largely of sexually titillating anecdotes about nuns." In 1793, a continuation titled A Sentimental Journey; Intended as a Sequel to Mr Sterne's, attributed to "Mr. Shandy," described Yorick's successful completion of the second half of his itinerary in Italy.

Other responses to A Sentimental Journey presented the perspectives of various side characters, such as the novel The Letters of Maria; to which is Added, an Account of her Death (1790). This novel was published anonymously and initial reviewers assumed it was written by a man, but an 1814 catalogue from the Minerva Press identifies its author as "Miss Street". Reviews criticized Street's writing as unable to live up to Sterne's, but her novel inspired its own response publication, a poem by M. Maria Cannon titled "Maria and St. Flos." Another novel using a character from A Sentimental Journey is Jane Timbury's The Story of Le Fevre, From the Works of Laurence Sterne, which follows Yorick's servant. This novel was also poorly reviewed for failing to live up to Sterne.

Later writers paid homage to Sterne in new narratives of their own travels. From 1770 to 1777, The Lady's Magazine published a serial feature titled "A Sentimental Journey, by a Lady." The work appeared monthly; in its later years, its connections to Sterne were reduced. In 1794, Jane Harvey published A Sentimental Tour through Newcastle, which borrows Sterne's prose style for a meandering tour of her small hometown, interspersed with philosophical reflections on the value of female education. In the 1880s, American writer Elizabeth Robins Pennell and her artist husband Joseph Pennell undertook a journey following Sterne's route. Their travels by tandem bicycle were turned into the book Our Sentimental Journey through France and Italy (1888). The Russian writer and theorist Viktor Shklovsky considered Sterne one of his most important precursors as a writer, and his own A Sentimental Journey: Memoirs, 1917–1922 was indebted to both Sterne's Sentimental Journey and Tristram Shandy.

== Footnotes ==
=== Bibliography ===
- Descargues, Madeleine (1994). "French Reflections : On a Few Reflections of the French in Sterne's Letters and A Sentimental Journey". XVII-XVIII. Revue de la Société d'études anglo-américaines des XVIIe et XVIIIe siècles. 38 (1): 255–269. doi:10.3406/xvii.1994.1301.
- Gerard, W.B. (2002). "Benevolent Vision: The Ideology of Sentimentality in Contemporary Illustrations of A Sentimental Journey and The Man of Feeling". Eighteenth-Century Fiction. 14 (3): 533–574. doi:10.1353/ecf.2002.0017. ISSN 1911-0243.
- Gerard, William Blake; Newbould, Mary-Céline, eds. (2021). Laurence Sterne's A Sentimental Journey: A Legacy to the World. Bucknell University Press.
  - Hardie-Forsyth, Alexander. "(O)economy and Order: Laurence Sterne's Chaptering". In Gerard & Newbould (2021).
- Goring, Paul (2020). "The Evolution of 'A Sentimental Journey, by a Lady' in The Lady's Magazine". The Shandean. 31 (1): 67–100. doi:10.3828/shandean.2020.31.09.
- Head, Dominic, ed. (2006). "Travels through France and Italy". The Cambridge Guide to Literature in English (3rd ed.). Cambridge University Press.
- Howes, Alan B. (1996). "A Sentimental Journey (1768)". Laurence Sterne: The Critical Heritage. Routledge.
- Jack, Ian; Parnell, Tim, eds. (2008). A Sentimental Journey and Other Writings. Oxford: Oxford University Press. ISBN 978-0-19-953718-1.
- Jack, Ian; Parnell, Tim (10 July 2003). A Sentimental Journey and Other Writings. OUP Oxford. ISBN 978-0-19-160620-5.
- Keymer, Thomas (20 August 2009). The Cambridge Companion to Laurence Sterne. Cambridge University Press. ISBN 978-1-139-82756-0.
- Newbould, Mary (2008). "Sex, death and the aposiopesis: Two early attempts to fill the gaps of Laurence Sterne's A Sentimental Journey". Postgraduate English (17). ISSN 1756-9761.
- Ogée, Frédéric (2013). "The Erratic and the Erotic : The Aesthetics of A Sentimental Journey". The Shandean. 24 (1): 104–116. doi:10.3828/shandean.2013.24.09.
- Owens, William James (1994). The evolution of Sterne's "A Sentimental Journey" (Ph.D. thesis). University of Virginia. ProQuest 304134411.
- Putney, Rufus (1940). "The Evolution of A Sentimental Journey". Philological Quarterly. 19. ProQuest 1290998872.
- Reed, Daniel (3 December 2024). "'The Figure of the Old with the Pathetic Tenderness of the New': An Early Reading of Sterne's A Sentimental Journey (1768)". Humanities. 13 (6): 166. doi:10.3390/h13060166. ISSN 2076-0787.
- Turner, Katherine (25 August 2010). A Sentimental Journey through France and Italy. Broadview Press. ISBN 978-1-77048-701-7.
- Williams, Helen (14 April 2023). "Laurence Sterne and Women's Writing". In Cope, Kevin L.; Cahill, Samara Anne (eds.). 1650-1850: Ideas, Aesthetics, and Inquiries in the Early Modern Era (Volume 28). Bucknell University Press. doi:10.2307/jj.18427177.5. ISBN 978-1-68448-465-2.
- Woolf, Virginia (1935). "The 'Sentimental Journey'". The Common Reader: Second Series.
