= Richard Newton (caricaturist) =

English caricaturist, miniaturist and book illustrator

- Born: 19 May 1777; London, England
- Died: 8 December 1798 (aged 21); London, England
- Occupation: Caricaturist
- Years active: 1790–98

Richard Newton (19 May 1777 – 8 December 1798) was an English caricaturist, miniaturist and book illustrator.

== Life and works ==
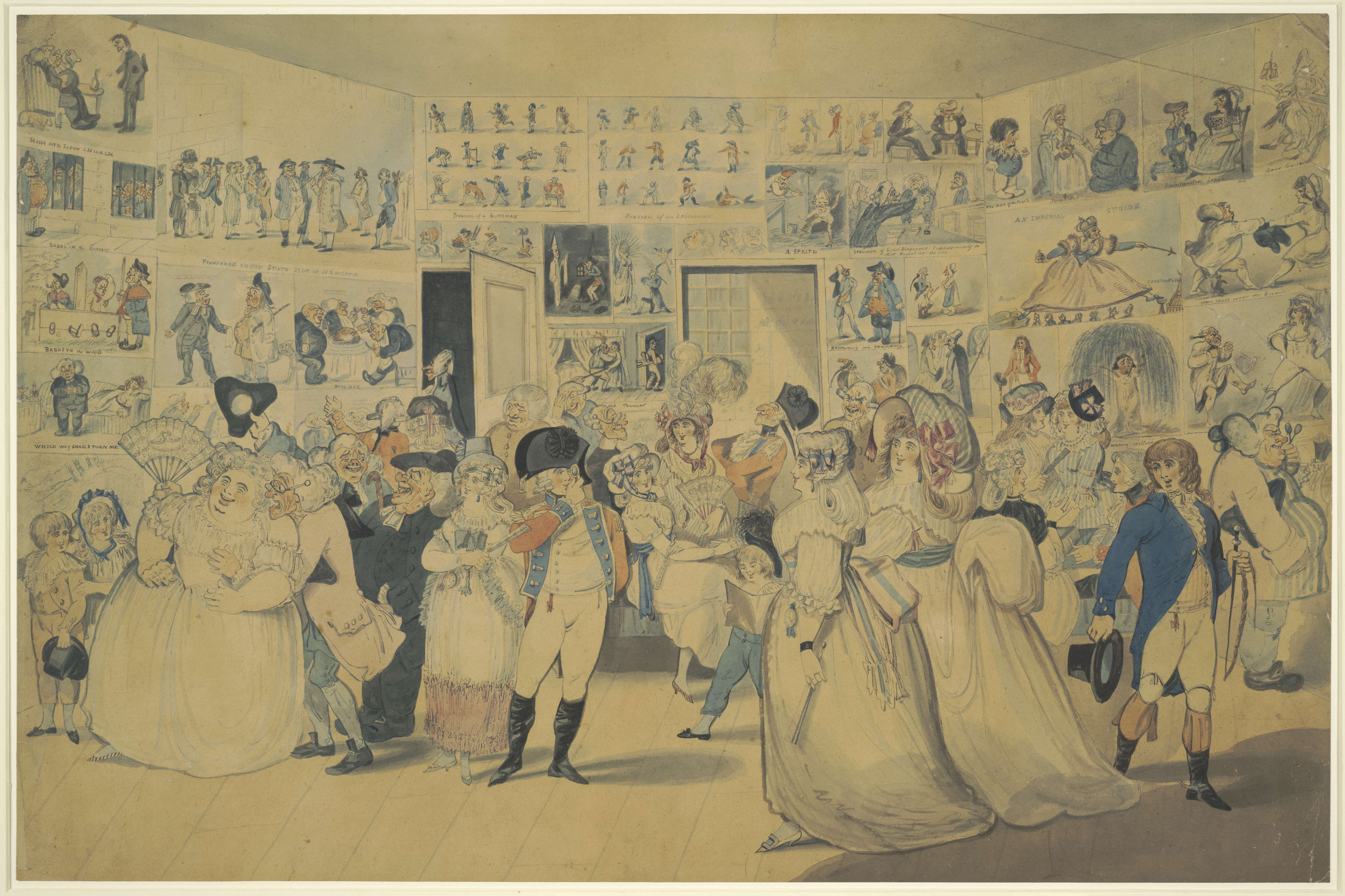
William Holland's Print shop, c. 1794, drawing by Richard Newton, British Museum

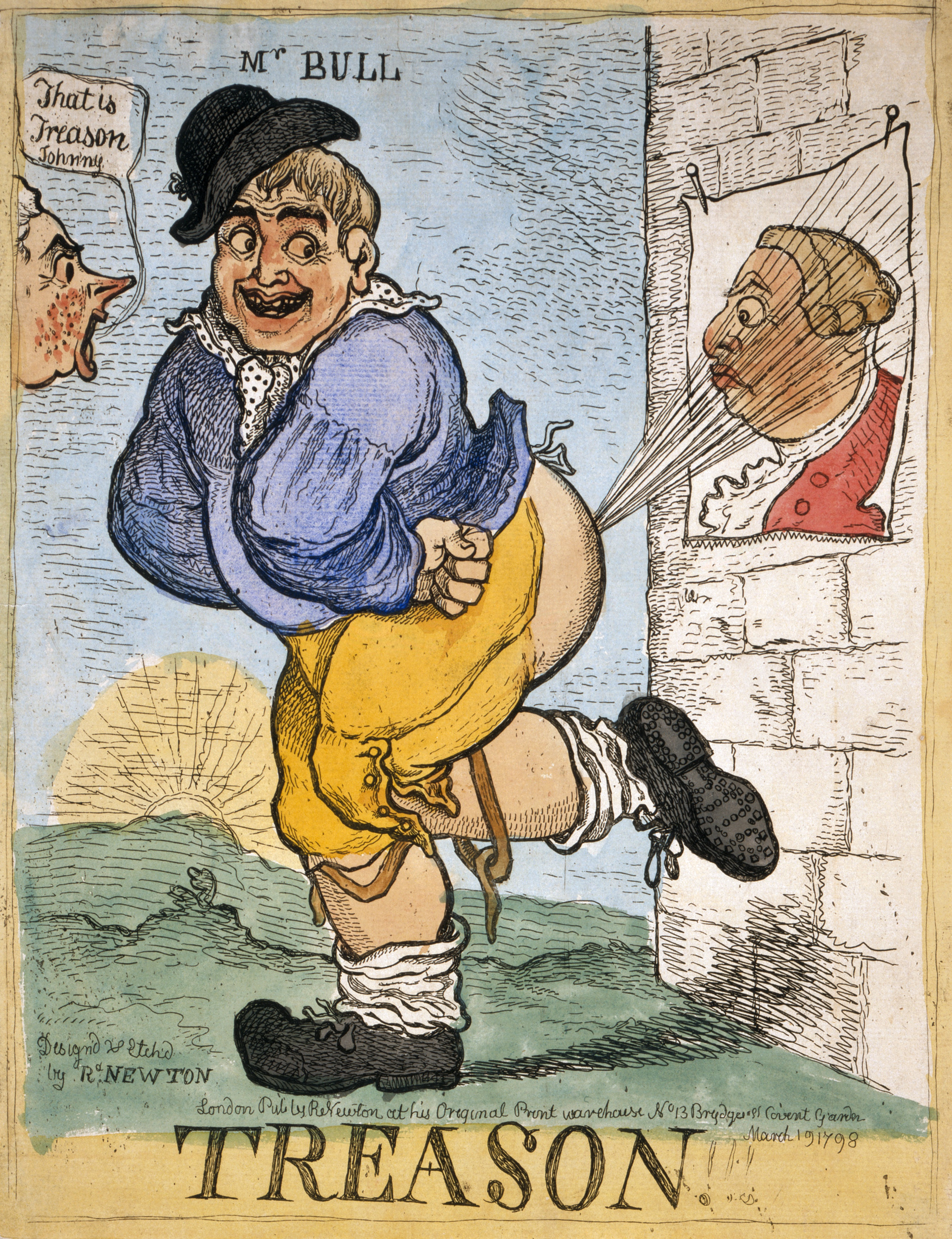
Newton's defence of habeas corpus, 1798

Born in London, Newton published his first caricature at thirteen. His work included caricatures expressing the English prejudice of the Scots as lean and hungry opportunists. He worked for radical publisher William Holland, producing anti-slavery works among his output, as well as "rude assaults" against Napoleon and the royal family. Newton minded Holland's shop when Holland was imprisoned for sedition during 1793–94. His watercolour (now in the British Museum) of fashionably dressed Londoners looking at prints in Holland's shop in Oxford Street, London, gives a depiction of an 18th-century print shop, and images of many of Holland's actual prints can be recognized on the walls. In 1794, Holland published an edition of Laurence Sterne's A Sentimental Journey Through France and Italy with twelve plates by Newton.

Newton produced nearly 300 single sheet prints of which the British Museum's collection includes more than half. M. Dorothy George's "Catalogue of Political and Personal Satires Preserved in the Department of Prints and Drawings in the British Museum" lists 98 prints by Newton.

Newton died of typhus in London at the age of 21.

== Books illustrated by Richard Newton ==
- Henry Fielding Tom Jones (1799)
- Laurence Sterne A Sentimental Journey through France and Italy (1794)
