= List of Les Misérables characters =

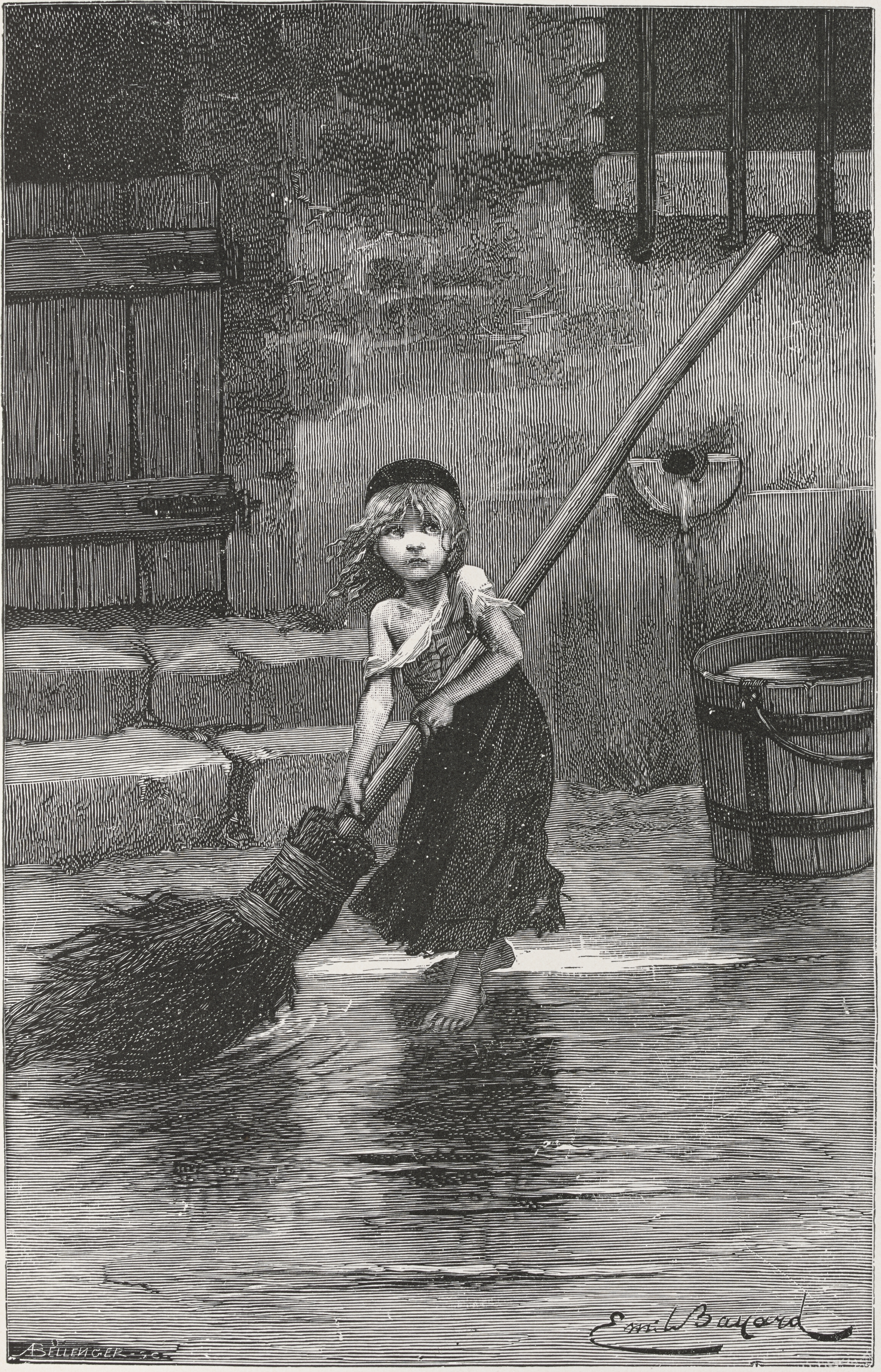
An illustration of Cosette by Émile Bayard

This is a list of characters in Les Misérables, an 1862 historical novel by Victor Hugo. The characters are listed in order by their first substantial appearance in the book.

== Characters ==
In order of introduction:

=== Volume I – Fantine ===
Book 1: An Upright Man

- Bishop Myriel – The Bishop of Digne (full name Charles-François-Bienvenu Myriel, also called Monseigneur Bienvenu) – A kindly old priest promoted to bishop after a chance encounter with Napoleon. After Valjean steals some silver from him, he saves Valjean from being arrested and inspires Valjean to change his ways.
- (Mlle) Baptistine Myriel – Bishop Myriel's sister. She loves and venerates her brother.
- Magloire, Madame – Domestic servant to Bishop Myriel and his sister.

Book 2: The Outcast

- Jean Valjean (also known as Monsieur Madeleine, Ultime Fauchelevent, Monsieur Leblanc, and Urbain Fabre) – The protagonist of the novel. Convicted for stealing a loaf of bread to feed his sister's seven starving children and sent to prison for five years, he is paroled from prison nineteen years later (after four unsuccessful escape attempts added twelve years and fighting back during the second escape attempt added two extra years). Rejected by society for being a former convict, he encounters Bishop Myriel, who turns his life around by showing him mercy and encouraging him to become a new man. While sitting and pondering what Bishop Myriel had said, he puts his shoe on a forty-sou piece dropped by a young wanderer. Valjean threatens the boy with his stick when the boy attempts to rouse Valjean from his reverie and recover his money. He tells a passing priest his name, and the name of the boy, and this allows the police to charge him with armed robbery – a sentence that, if he were caught again, would return him to prison for life. He assumes a new identity (Monsieur Madeleine) in order to pursue an honest life. He introduces new manufacturing techniques and eventually builds two factories and becomes one of the richest men in the area. By popular acclaim, he is made mayor. He confronts Javert over Fantine's punishment, turns himself in to the police to save another man from prison for life, and rescues Cosette from the Thénardiers. Discovered by Javert in Paris because of his generosity to the poor, he evades capture for the next several years in a convent. He saves Javert from imprisonment and probable death at the barricade, reveals his true identity to Marius and Cosette after their wedding, and is reunited with them just before his death, having kept his promise to the Bishop and to Fantine.
- Petit Gervais – A travelling Savoyard boy who drops a coin. Valjean, still a man of criminal mind, places his foot on the coin and refuses to return it.

Book 3: In the Year 1817

- Fantine – A beautiful Parisian grisette abandoned with a small child by her lover Félix Tholomyès. Fantine leaves her daughter Cosette in the care of the Thénardiers, innkeepers in the village of Montfermeil. Mme. Thénardier spoils her own daughters and abuses Cosette. Fantine finds work at Monsieur Madeleine's factory. Illiterate, she has others write letters to the Thénardiers on her behalf. A female supervisor discovers that she is an unwed mother and dismisses her. To meet the Thénardiers' repeated demands for money, she sells her hair and two front teeth, and turns to prostitution. She becomes ill. Valjean learns of her plight when Javert arrests her for attacking a man who called her insulting names and threw snow down her back, and sends her to a hospital. As Javert confronts Valjean in her hospital room, because her illness has made her so weak, she dies of shock after Javert reveals that Valjean is a convict and hasn't brought her daughter Cosette to her (after the doctor encouraged that incorrect belief that Jean Valjean's recent absence was because he was bringing her daughter to her).
- Félix Tholomyès – Fantine's lover and Cosette's biological father. A wealthy, self-centered student in Paris originally from Toulouse, he eventually abandons Fantine when their daughter is two years old.
- Blachevelle – A wealthy student in Paris originally from Montauban. He is a friend of Félix Tholomyès and becomes romantically involved with Fantine's friend Favourite.
- Dahlia – A young grisette in Paris and member of Fantine's group of seamstress friends along with Favourite and Zéphine. She becomes romantically involved with Félix Tholomyès' friend Listolier.
- Fameuil – A wealthy student in Paris originally from Limoges. He is a friend of Félix Tholomyès and becomes romantically involved with Fantine's friend Zéphine.
- Favourite – A young grisette in Paris and leader of Fantine's group of seamstress friends (including Zéphine and Dahlia). She is independent and well versed in the ways of the world and had previously been in England. Although she cannot stand Félix Tholomyès' friend Blachevelle and is in love with someone else, she endures a relationship with him so she can enjoy the perks of courting a wealthy man.
- Listolier – A wealthy student in Paris originally from Cahors. He is a friend of Félix Tholomyès and becomes romantically involved with Fantine's friend Dahlia.
- Zéphine – A young grisette in Paris and member of Fantine's group of seamstress friends along with Favourite and Dahlia. She becomes romantically involved with Félix Tholomyès' friend Fameuil.

Book 4: To Trust Is Sometimes to Surrender

- Cosette (formally Euphrasie, also known as "the Lark", Mademoiselle Lanoire, Ursula) – The illegitimate daughter of Fantine and Tholomyès. From approximately the age of three to the age of eight, she is beaten and forced to work as a drudge for the Thénardiers. After her mother Fantine dies, Valjean ransoms Cosette from the Thénardiers and cares for her as if she were his daughter. Nuns in a Paris convent educate her. She grows up to become very beautiful. She falls in love with Marius Pontmercy and marries him near the novel's conclusion.
- Monsieur Thénardier and Madame Thénardier (also known as the Jondrettes, M. Fabantou, M. Thénard. Some translations identify her as the Thenardiess) – Husband and wife, parents of five children: two daughters, Éponine and Azelma, and three sons, Gavroche and two unnamed younger sons. As innkeepers, they abuse Cosette as a child and extort payment from Fantine for her support, until Valjean takes Cosette away. They become bankrupt and relocate under the name Jondrette to a house in Paris called the Gorbeau house, living in the room next to Marius. The husband associates with a criminal group called "the Patron-Minette", and conspires to rob Valjean until he is thwarted by Marius. Javert arrests the couple. The wife dies in prison. Her husband attempts to blackmail Marius with his knowledge of Valjean's past, but Marius pays him to leave the country and he becomes a slave trader in the United States.
- Éponine (the Jondrette girl) – The Thénardiers' elder daughter. As a child, she is pampered and spoiled by her parents, but ends up a street urchin when she reaches adolescence. She participates in her father's crimes and begging schemes to obtain money. She is blindly in love with Marius. At Marius' request, she finds Valjean and Cosette's house for him leads him there. She also prevents her father, Patron-Minette, and Brujon from robbing the house during one of Marius' visits there to see Cosette. After disguising herself as a boy, she manipulates Marius into going to the barricades, hoping that she and Marius will die there together. Wanting to die before Marius, she reaches out her hand to stop a soldier from shooting at him; she is mortally wounded as the bullet goes through her hand and her back. As she is dying, she confesses all this to Marius, and gives him a letter from Cosette. Her final request to Marius is that once she has passed, he will kiss her on the forehead. He fulfills her request not because of romantic feelings on his part, but out of pity for her hard life.
- Azelma – The younger daughter of the Thénardiers. Like her sister Éponine, she is spoiled as a child, impoverished when older. She abets her father's failed robbery of Valjean. On Marius and Cosette's wedding day, she tails Valjean on her father's orders. She travels to America with her father at the end of the novel.

Book 5: Degradation

- Javert – A fanatic police inspector in pursuit to recapture Valjean. Born in the prisons to a convict father and a fortune teller mother, he renounces both of them and starts working as a guard in the prison, including one stint as the overseer for the chain gang of which Valjean is part (and here witnesses firsthand Valjean's enormous strength and just what he looks like). Eventually he joins the police force in the small town identified only as M____-sur-M__. He arrests Fantine and butts heads with Valjean/Madeleine, who orders him to release Fantine. Valjean dismisses Javert in front of his squad and Javert, seeking revenge, reports to the Police Inspector that he has discovered Jean Valjean. He is told that he must be incorrect, as a man mistakenly believed to be Jean Valjean was just arrested. He requests of M. Madeline that he be dismissed in disgrace, for he cannot be less harsh on himself than on others. When the real Jean Valjean turns himself in, Javert is promoted to the Paris police force where he arrests Valjean and sends him back to prison. After Valjean escapes again, Javert attempts one more arrest in vain. He then almost recaptures Valjean at Gorbeau house when he arrests the Thénardiers and Patron-Minette. Later, while working undercover behind the barricade, his identity is discovered. Valjean pretends to execute Javert, but releases him. When Javert next encounters Valjean emerging from the sewers, he allows him to make a brief visit home and then walks off instead of arresting him. Javert cannot reconcile his devotion to the law with his recognition that the lawful course is immoral. After composing a letter to the prefect of police outlining the squalid conditions that occur in prisons and the abuses that prisoners are subjected to, he takes his own life by jumping into the Seine.
- Fauchelevent – A failed businessman whom Valjean (as M. Madeleine) saves from being crushed under a carriage. Valjean gets him a position as gardener at a Paris convent, where Fauchelevent later provides sanctuary for Valjean and Cosette and allows Valjean to pose as his brother.
- Bamatabois – An idler who harasses Fantine. Later a juror at Champmathieu's trial.

Book 6: Javert

- Champmathieu – A vagabond who is misidentified as Valjean after being caught stealing apples.
- Brevet – An ex-convict from Toulon who knew Valjean there; released one year after Valjean. In 1823, he is serving time in the prison in Arras for an unknown crime. He is the first to claim that Champmathieu is really Valjean. He used to wear knitted, checkered suspenders.

Book 7: The Champmathieu Affair

- Sister Simplice – A famously truthful nun who cares for Fantine on her sickbed and lies to Javert to protect Valjean.
- Chenildieu – A lifer from Toulon. He and Valjean were chain mates for five years. He once tried to unsuccessfully remove his lifer's brand TFP ("travaux forcés à perpetuité", "forced labour for life") by putting his shoulder on a chafing dish full of embers. He is described as a small, wiry but energetic man.
- Cochepaille – Another lifer from Toulon. He used to be a shepherd from the Pyrenees who became a smuggler. He is described as stupid and has a tattoo on his arm, 1 Mars 1815.

=== Volume II – Cosette ===
Book 6: Le Petit-Picpus

- Mother Innocente (a.k.a. Marguerite de Blemeur) – The prioress of the Petit-Picpus convent.

=== Volume III – Marius ===
Book 1: Paris in Microcosm

- Gavroche – The unloved middle child and eldest son of the Thénardiers. He lives on his own as a street urchin and sleeps inside an elephant statue outside the Bastille. He briefly takes care of his two younger brothers, unaware they are related to him. He takes part in the barricades and is killed while collecting bullets from dead National Guardsmen.

Book 2: A Grand Bourgeois

- Magnon – Former servant of M. Gillenormand and friend of the Thénardiers. She had been receiving child support payments from M. Gillenormand for her two illegitimate sons, who she claimed were fathered by him. When her sons died in an epidemic, she had them replaced with the Thénardiers' two youngest sons so that she could protect her income. The Thénardiers get a portion of the payments. She is incorrectly arrested for involvement in the Gorbeau robbery.
- Monsieur Gillenormand – Marius' grandfather. A monarchist, he disagrees sharply with Marius on political issues, and they have several arguments. He attempts to keep Marius from being influenced by his father, Colonel Georges Pontmercy. While in perpetual conflict over ideas, he does illustrate his love for his grandson.
- Mademoiselle Gillenormand – Daughter of M. Gillenormand, with whom she lives. Her late half-sister (M. Gillenormand's daughter from another marriage), was Marius' mother.
- Marius Pontmercy – A young law student loosely associated with the Friends of the ABC. He shares the political principles of his father and has a tempestuous relationship with his royalist grandfather, Monsieur Gillenormand. He falls in love with Cosette and fights on the barricades when he believes Valjean has taken her to London. After he and Cosette marry, he recognizes Thénardier as a swindler and pays him to leave France.

Book 3: Grandfather and Grandson

- Colonel Georges Pontmercy – Marius's father and an officer in Napoleon's army. Wounded at Waterloo, Pontmercy erroneously believes M. Thénardier saved his life. He tells Marius of this great debt. He loves Marius and although M. Gillenormand does not allow him to visit, he continually hid behind a pillar in the church on Sunday so that he could at least look at Marius from a distance. Napoleon made him a baron, but the next regime refused to recognize his barony or his status as a colonel, instead referring to him only as a commandant. The book usually calls him "The colonel".
- Mabeuf – An elderly churchwarden, friend of Colonel Pontmercy, who after the Colonel's death befriends his son Marius and helps Marius realize his father loved him. Mabeuf loves plants and books, but sells his books and prints in order to pay for a friend's medical care. When Mabeuf finds a purse in his yard, he takes it to the police. After selling his last book, he joins the students in the insurrection. He is shot dead raising the flag atop the barricade.

Book 4: The A B C Society
A revolutionary student club. In French, the letters "ABC" are pronounced identically to the French word abaissés, "the abased".

- Enjolras – The leader of Les Amis de l'ABC (Friends of the ABC) in the Paris uprising. A resolute and charismatic youth, he is passionately committed to republican principles and the idea of progress. He and Grantaire are executed by the National Guards after the barricade falls.
- Combeferre – A medical student who is described as representing the philosophy of the revolution.
- Jean Prouvaire (also Jehan) – A Romantic with knowledge of Italian, Latin, Greek, and Hebrew, and an interest in the Middle Ages.
- Feuilly – An orphaned fan maker who taught himself to read and write. He is the only member of the Friends who is not a student.
- Courfeyrac – A law student who is described as the centre of the group of Friends. He is honorable and warm and is Marius' closest companion.
- Bahorel – A dandy and an idler from a peasant background, who is known well around the student cafés of Paris.
- Lesgle (also Lègle, Laigle, L'Aigle [The Eagle] or Bossuet) – The only member of the Amis who is not from the south. Considered notoriously unlucky, he begins balding at the age of twenty-five. It is Lesgle who introduces Marius to the Friends.
- Joly – A medical student who has unusual theories about health. He is a hypochondriac and is described as the happiest of the Friends.
- Grantaire – Grantaire (Also known as "R") was a student revolutionary with little interest in the cause. He reveres Enjolras, and his admiration is the main reason that Grantaire spends time with Les Amis de l'ABC (Friends of the ABC), despite Enjolras's occasional scorn for him. Grantaire is often drunk and is unconscious for the majority of the June Rebellion. Despite his pessimism, he eventually declares himself a believer in the Republic; he and Enjolras are executed by the National Guards after the barricade falls.

Book 6: Conjunction of Two Stars

- Bougon, Madame (called Ma'am Burgon) – Housekeeper of Gorbeau House.

Book 7: Patron-Minette

- Patron-Minette – A quartet of bandits who assist in the Thénardiers' ambush of Valjean at Gorbeau House and the attempted robbery at the Rue Plumet. The gang consists of Montparnasse, Claquesous, Babet, and Gueulemer. Claquesous, who escaped from the carriage transporting him to prison after the Gorbeau Robbery, joins the revolution under the guise of "Le Cabuc" and is executed by Enjolras for firing on civilians.

=== Volume IV – The Idyll in the Rue Plumet and the Epic of the Rue Saint-Denis ===
Book 2: Éponine

- Brujon – A robber and criminal. He participates in crimes with M. Thénardier and the Patron-Minette gang (such as the Gorbeau Robbery and the attempted robbery at the Rue Plumet). The author describes Brujon as being "a sprightly young fellow, very cunning and very adroit, with a flurried and plaintive appearance."

Book 3: The House in the Rue Plumet

- Toussaint – Valjean and Cosette's servant in Paris. She has a slight stutter.

Book 6: The Boy Gavroche

- Two little boys – The two unnamed youngest sons of the Thénardiers, whom they send to Magnon to replace her two dead sons. Living on the streets, they encounter Gavroche, who is unaware they are his siblings but treats them like they are his brothers. After Gavroche's death, they retrieve bread tossed by a bourgeois man to geese in a fountain at the Luxembourg Garden.

=== The narrator ===
Hugo does not give the narrator a name and allows the reader to identify the narrator with the novel's author. The narrator occasionally injects himself into the narrative or reports facts outside the time of the narrative to emphasize that he is recounting historical events, not entirely fiction. He introduces his recounting of Waterloo with several paragraphs describing the narrator's recent approach to the battlefield: "Last year (1861), on a beautiful May morning, a traveller, the person who is telling this story, was coming from Nivelles ..." The narrator describes how "[a]n observer, a dreamer, the author of this book" during the 1832 street fighting was caught in crossfire: "All that he had to protect him from the bullets was the swell of the two half columns which separate the shops; he remained in this delicate situation for nearly half an hour." At one point he apologizes for intruding—"The author of this book, who regrets the necessity of mentioning himself"—to ask the reader's understanding when he describes "the Paris of his youth ... as though it still existed." This introduces a meditation on memories of past places that his contemporary readers would recognize as a self-portrait written from exile: "you have left a part of your heart, of your blood, of your soul, in those pavements." He describes another occasion when a bullet shot "pierced a brass shaving-dish suspended ... over a hairdresser's shop. This pierced shaving-dish was still to be seen in 1848, in the Rue du Contrat-Social, at the corner of the pillars of the market." As evidence of police double agents at the barricades, he writes: "The author of this book had in his hands, in 1848, the special report on this subject made to the Prefect of Police in 1832."
