= Smelfungus =

Smelfungus is a character in the novel A Sentimental Journey Through France and Italy, written by Laurence Sterne in 1768. The character was created as a satire of Tobias Smollett, himself author of a volume of Travels Through France and Italy, which was published in 1766. Sterne had met Smollett during his own travels in Europe, and strongly objected to Smollett's "spleen, acerbity and quarrelsomeness". He modelled the character of Smelfungus on him for the "snarling abuse he heaps on the institutions and customs of the countries he visited".

The term "smellfungus" (pl. "smellfungi") thereafter passed into broader use to describe a grumbling traveller, and might even be applied to a faultfinder in general.

== Smollett in Europe ==
Smollett's 1764 journey to Continental Europe took place in the wake of a family bereavement, and while he was in poor health—matters which may explain the sharp tone of many of his comments on people, things and places he saw. Thus for example he described the Venus de Medici as having "no beauty in the features" and having an attitude which "is awkward and out of character"—prompting Sterne's remark that "he had fallen foul upon the goddess, and used her worse than a common strumpet".

Revisionists have argued however that the "Smollett" in the Travels book is a character Smollett intentionally created, rather than him speaking in his own voice as Sterne (facetiously) implies.

== Carlyle's usage ==
In the 19th century Smelfungus was adopted by Thomas Carlyle as a pen-name when he had any seriously severe criticisms to offer on things, particularly those that have gone or are going to the bad. Patrick Proctor Alexander also used the name in his book Mill and Carlyle, which contrasted Carlyle's views with those of John Stuart Mill. Proctor's Occasional Discourse on Sauertieg by Smelfungus attacks Carlyle's more brutal ideas.
