= John Colley Nixon =

English merchant and amateur artist

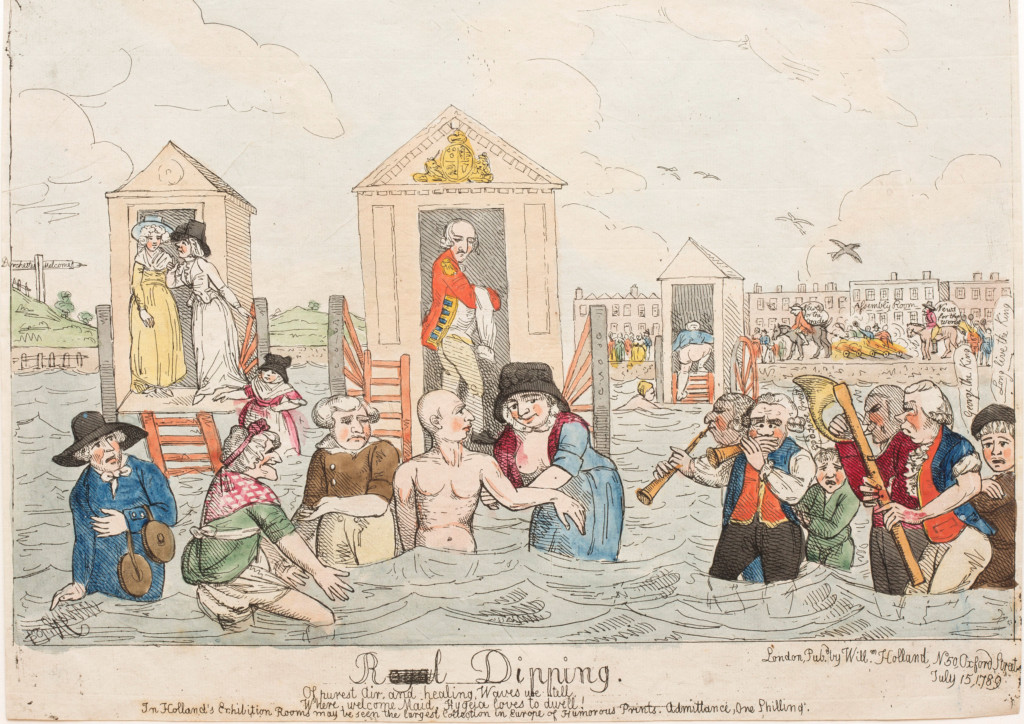
Royal Dipping by Nixon, 1789

John Colley Nixon (baptised as John Coley Nixon on 18 August 1755, died 1818) was an English merchant and amateur artist.

One of the best-known amateur artists of the late eighteenth century, producing landscape paintings, engraved cartoons, and illustrations, Nixon made the greatest impact with his caricatures of urban life and was secretary of the Beefsteak Club.

== Early life ==
One of the sons of Robert Nixon, a successful City of London merchant of Irish origins, he had brothers called Robert (1759–1837), who became a clergyman, Richard, and James.

== Career ==
Nixon became a merchant, with his brother Richard, living and working in Basinghall Street, London. He was also a captain in the Guildhall Volunteers and honorary secretary of the Beefsteak Club. Exhibiting paintings at the Royal Academy of Arts between 1781 and 1813, he moved in leading social and artistic circles.

Nixon made many visits to Ireland and around Britain in the 1780s and 1790s, combining business and pleasure, as he made sketches of the places he visited. He also travelled on the continent, his first such tour being in 1783–1784. Some of his topographical drawings were included in William Watts‘s Seats of the Nobility and Gentry (1779–1786), and in 1786 the Royal Academy hosted an exhibition of his illustrations for Laurence Sterne’s Tristram Shandy. In 1791 he was joined on one of his journeys to Ireland by Francis Grose, and the next year was in Bath with Thomas Rowlandson. He became a friend of the writer Elizabeth Craven while she was living at Brandenburgh House, Hammersmith, and notably acted in plays staged there. He drew many popular caricatures, which were often published by William Holland. These tended to satirise social events.

Nixon illustrated Thomas Pennant's Journey from London to the Isle of Wight (1801) and his Guide to Watering Places (1803).

Nixon’s brother the Rev. Robert Nixon also exhibited at the Royal Academy between 1790 and 1808. While he was curate at Foots Cray, in 1793, he was visited by J. M. W. Turner, who gave him lessons in landscape painting, and he was also taught by Stephen Rigaud. Another brother, James, painted miniatures.

In later life Nixon inherited an estate called Upland, at Ilford, Essex, from Richard Eastland, who was his great uncle.

A frequent visitor to the Isle of Wight, Nixon died on the island, at Ryde, in 1818.

== Works ==
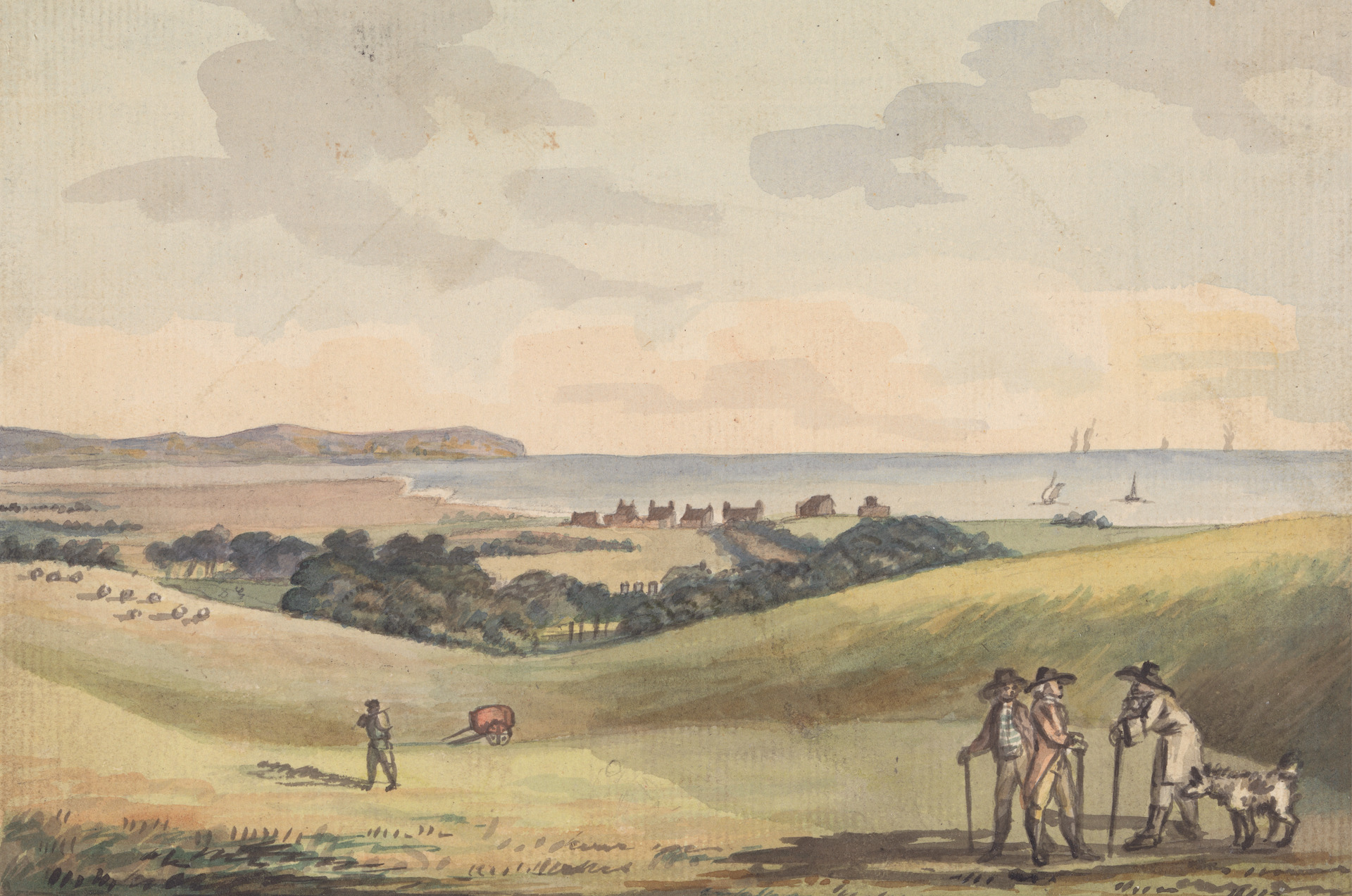
Eastbourne from Lord G. Cavendish's Seat in the Park
