= Frederick George Byron =

Frederick George Byron (1764–1792), was an English amateur artist and caricaturist, and a relative of the poet the 6th Lord Byron (specifically, first cousin once removed), born in Mansfield in December 1764.

Many of his works are unsigned and have frequently been attributed to other artists; in particular some of his works closely resemble those of Thomas Rowlandson. He made numerous plates for William Holland, between 1788–91, see the Catalogue of Political and Personal Satires Preserved in the Department of Prints and Drawings in the British Museum.

Byron exhibited at the Society of Artists of Great Britain in 1791. His large plates of France from 1790 are discussed in Bordes, 1992.

After achieving some renown for his satirical artworks, including a number of depictions of life in France during the revolution, he took ill and died at Bristol aged just 27. He was buried at St Andrew's, Clifton on 3 February 1792.
