= Grisette (person) =

17th century French term for a working-class woman

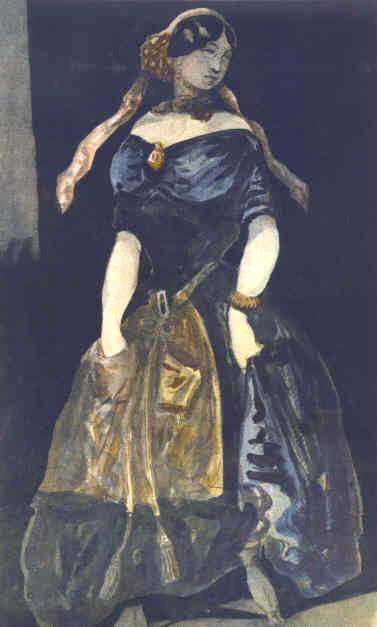
La Grisette by Constantin Guys

The word grisette (sometimes spelled grizette) has referred to a French working-class woman from the late 17th century and remained in common use through the Belle Époque era, albeit with some modifications to its meaning. It derives from gris (French for grey) and refers to the cheap grey fabric of the dresses these women originally wore. The 1694 edition of the Dictionnaire de l'Académie française described a grisette as simply "a woman of lowly condition". By the 1835 edition of the dictionary, her status had risen somewhat. She was described as:

...a young working woman who is coquettish and flirtatious.

This usage can be seen in one of Oliver Wendell Holmes' early poems "Our Yankee Girls" (1830):

...the gay grisette, whose fingers touch love's thousand chords so well. ...

In practice, "young working woman" referred primarily to those employed in the garment and millinery trades as seamstresses or shop assistants, the few occupations open to them in 19th century urban France, apart from domestic service. The sexual connotations which had long accompanied the word are made explicit in Webster's Third New International Dictionary (1976) which lists one of its meanings as a young woman who combines part-time prostitution with another occupation. Webster's quotes an example from Henry Seidel Canby's 1943 biography of Walt Whitman:

...and many years later [Whitman] was still talking to Traubel of the charm of the dusky grisettes who sold love as well as flowers on the streets of New Orleans.

== The 18th-century grisette ==
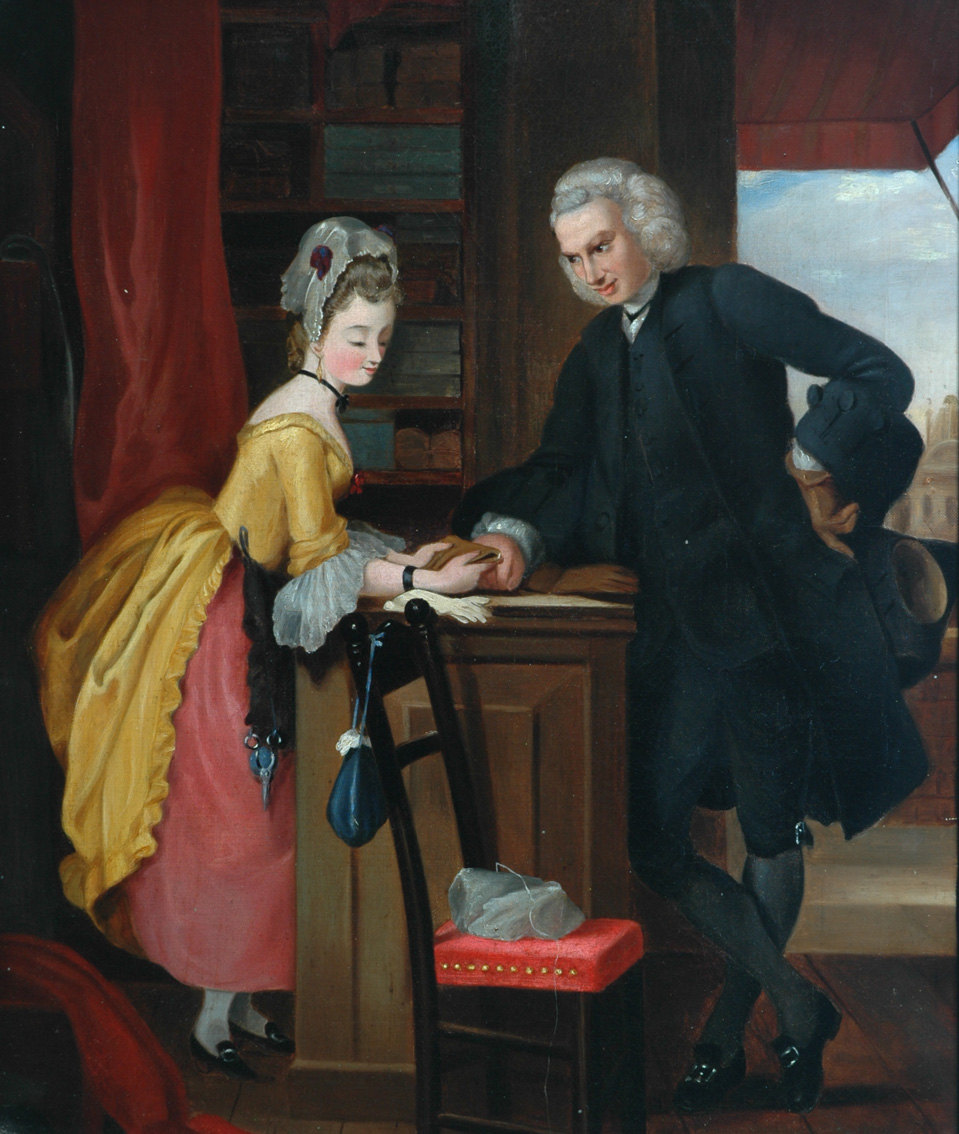
Yorick and the Grisette by Gilbert Stuart Newton, illustration from Sterne's A Sentimental Journey Through France and Italy

In 1730, Jonathan Swift was already using "grisette" in English to signify qualities of both flirtatiousness and intellectual aspiration. (See The grisette in poetry below.) The grisette also makes an appearance in Laurence Sterne's 1768 novel A Sentimental Journey Through France and Italy. In Chapter II of the novel, the Reverend Mr. Yorick (the narrator and Sterne's alter ego) recounts his obsessions with Parisian grisettes, and especially with a particularly beautiful one who worked in a Paris glove shop:

The beautiful grisette looked sometimes at the gloves, then sideways to the window, then at the gloves, and then at me. I was not disposed to break silence. I followed her example: so, I looked at the gloves, then to the window, then at the gloves, and then at her, and so on alternately. I found I lost considerably in every attack: she had a quick black eye, and shot through two such long and silken eyelashes with such penetration, that she look'd into my very heart and reins. It may seem strange, but I could actually feel she did.

One of the most famous grisettes of the 18th century was Madame du Barry (1743–1793). However, she soon rose well beyond her initial social status. The illegitimate daughter of a seamstress, she had moved to Paris at the age of 15, where, using the name Jeanne Rancon, she worked first as an assistant to a young hairdresser with whom she had an affair and later as a milliner's assistant in a shop named A La Toilette. In 1763, her beauty came to the attention of Jean du Barry, a fashionable pimp/procurer and casino owner. He made her his mistress and helped establish her career as a courtesan in the highest circles of Parisian society, where she took several wealthy men as her "benefactors", including the Duke of Richelieu. On her marriage to du Barry's brother, she became Marie-Jeanne, Comtesse du Barry, and in April 1769 she became the official mistress (maîtresse declarée or maîtresse en titre) of King Louis XV.

== In Parisian bohemia ==
Deux grisettes et deux soldats by Constantin Guys

In the first quarter of the 19th century, grisette also came to refer more specifically to the independent young women, often working as seamstresses or milliner's assistants, who frequented bohemian artistic and cultural venues in Paris. They formed relationships with artists and poets more committed than prostitution but less so than a mistress. Many grisettes worked as artist's models, often providing sexual favours to the artists in addition to posing for them. During the time of King Louis Philippe I, they came to dominate the bohemian modelling scene. Although the grisette models were perceived to be adventurous, independent, and living only for moment, they sought not only economic support but also emotional and artistic support in their relationships with bohemian men. Jenny, whose story is recounted by Jules Janin in his essay "La Grisette", is a prototypical grisette in this sense, initially choosing to model only for artists whom she considers geniuses and declining more lucrative offers to become the lover of bourgeois or even aristocratic men. Janin considered the grisettes an integral part of the bohemian artistic scene, but viewed their sexual mores somewhat negatively and suggests that their independence was only superficial:

Art is the grand excuse for all actions that are beyond vulgar. It is art that purifies everything, even a poor young woman's submission of her body.

The grisette as part of the bohemian sub-culture was a frequent character in French fiction of the time. She is personified as Rigolette in Eugene Sue's The Mysteries of Paris, as Fantine in Victor Hugo's Les Misérables, and Marthe in George Sand's Horace, as well as in the protagonist in Alfred de Musset's Mademoiselle Mimi Pinson: Profil de grisette. Notable examples in British and American fiction are Trilby in the 1894 George du Maurier novel of the same name, and Marie in Edgar Allan Poe's short story "The Mystery of Marie Roget". Trilby was largely based on du Maurier's experiences as a student in Parisian bohemia during the 1850s. Poe's 1842 story was based on the unsolved murder of Mary Cecilia Rogers near New York City. Poe translated the setting to Paris and Mary Rogers to a young grisette, Marie Roget. It was the first detective story to attempt the solution of a real crime. Possibly the most enduring grisette of all is Mimi in Henri Murger's novel (and subsequent play) Scènes de la vie de Bohème, the source for Puccini's famous opera La bohème.

== In opera, musical theatre, and song ==
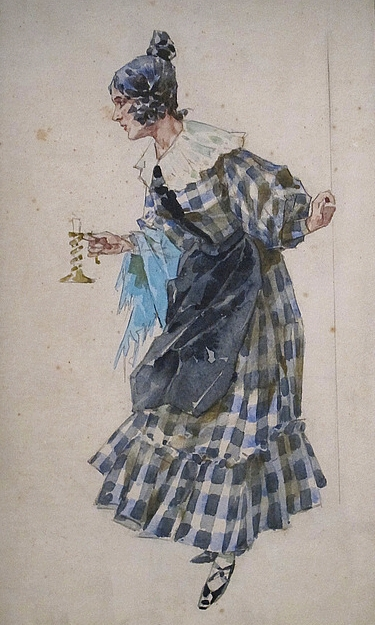
Mimì's costume for La bohème (Act I) designed by Hohenstein

As main characters

- Mimi Pinson 1882: musical by Gustave Michiels, Maurice Ordonneau, Arthur Verneuil, adapted from de Musset's short story, "Mademoiselle Mimi Pinson: Profil de grisette".
- Mimì and Musetta in La bohème 1896: opera by Giacomo Puccini, adapted from Murger's novel Scènes de la vie de Bohème.
- Mimì and Musette in La bohème 1897: opera by Ruggiero Leoncavallo, likewise adapted from Murger's Scènes de la vie de Bohème. A revised version of this opera, which gave a much bigger role to Mimì premiered in 1913 with the title Mimì Pinson.
- The Gay Grisette 1898: musical by Carl Kiefert and George Dance.
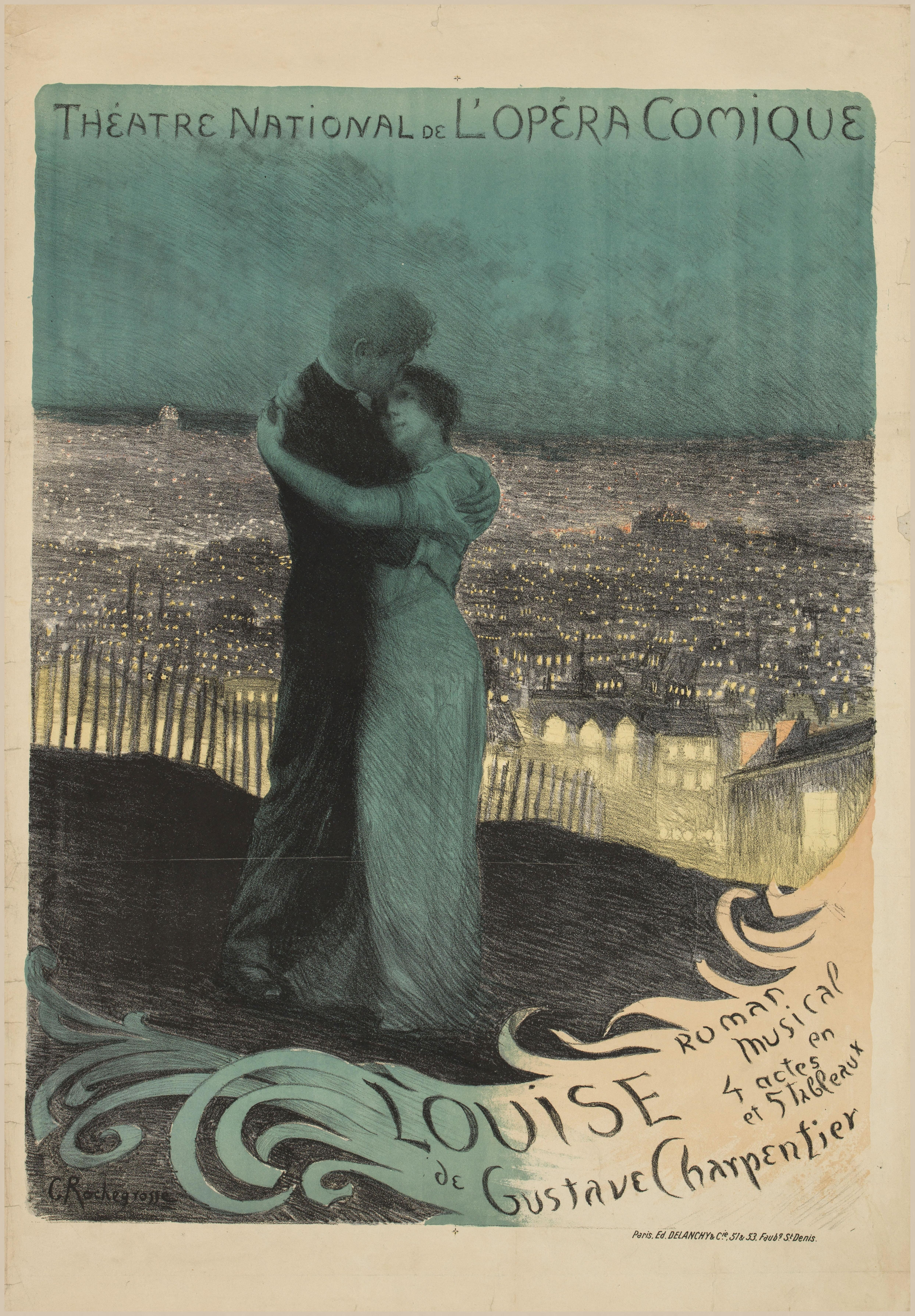
  Poster for the world premiere of Louise
- Louise in Louise 1900: opera by Gustave Charpentier.
- Magda in La rondine 1917: opera by Giacomo Puccini.
- Ninon in Das Veilchen vom Montmartre 1930: operetta by Emmerich Kálmán.
- Fantine in Les Misérables 1980 (English Version, 1985): musical by Claude-Michel Schönberg and Alain Boublil, adapted from Victor Hugo's novel Les Misérables.

In minor roles

- Yvonne, Yvette and Céleste in The Spring Chicken 1897: musical adapted by George Grossmith Jr. from Coquin de Printemps by Jaime and Duval.
- Lolo, Dodo, Jou-Jou, Frou-Frou, Clo-Clo and Margot (can-can dancing grisettes) in The Merry Widow 1905: operetta by Franz Lehár; and 1975: ballet adaptation using Lehar's music.
- Georgette, Gabriella and Lolette in La rondine 1917: opera by Giacomo Puccini.

In song

- "Mimi Pinson" 1846: a musical setting by Frédéric Bérat of de Musset's poem in "Mademoiselle Mimi Pinson: Profil de grisette", and a later, less well-known, setting by Gabriel Pierné.
- "Madam Yvonne" 1933: tango, music by Eduardo Pereyra, lyrics by Enrique Cadicamo.
- "Griseta" 1924: tango, music by Enrique Delfino, lyrics by José González Castillo.
- "Mimí Pinsón" 1947: tango, music by Aquiles Roggero, lyrics by José Rotulo.

== In art ==
Fumette by Whistler

Grisettes appeared in many caricatures of bohemian Paris, most notably in those by Daumier and Gavarni, as well as in illustrations of novels about them, such as George du Maurier's own engravings for his 1894 novel Trilby. The artist and war correspondent, Constantin Guys, frequently portrayed them in his sketches of Parisian life during the Second French Empire. A grisette likewise became the subject of one of Edward Hopper's early watercolours, painted in Paris in 1906. Hopper's portrayal, like several of those by Guys, shows the grisette wearing a traditional seamstress apron. However, their slightly raised skirts (particularly in the Guys sketches) and provocative poses also allude to the association of grisettes with prostitution.

Whistler's arresting 1858 portrait of Fumette, his lover at the time, reflects not only his aversion to sentimentality in painting but also the character of Fumette herself, who was a rather unusual grisette. Although Whistler had dubbed her 'Fumette' in imitation of 'Musette', a character in Scènes de la vie de Bohème, her real name was Eloise. A milliner's assistant, artist's model and reciter of poetry, she was known throughout the Latin Quarter as "the tigress" (la tigresse) for her raging voice and dangerous temper. Their ménage on the Rue Saint Sulpice lasted for two years and was a stormy one. One day in a fit of anger, she tore up a number of Whistler's drawings.

== In poetry ==
Jonathan Swift when he was a student at Trinity College, Dublin.

=== Jonathan Swift ===
Jonathan Swift's "To Betty, the Grisette", gives a rather jaundiced portrayal of the grisette and her intellectual pretensions. Swift's "grisette" (or "grizette" as spelled in early editions of his work) is Irish, not French, and demonstrates that the generic use of the term in English to indicate a woman of loose morals already existed by 1730. Betty is presumed to be a prostitute with whom Swift had consorted in Dublin.

Extract from "To Betty, the Grisette" (1730):

... Sets of phrases, cut and dry,
Evermore thy tongue supply;
And thy memory is loaded
With old scraps from plays exploded;
Stock'd with repartees and jokes,
Suited to all Christian folks:
Shreds of wit, and senseless rhymes,
Blunder'd out a thousand times;
Nor wilt thou of gifts be sparing,
Which can ne'er be worse for wearing.
Picking wit among collegians,
In the playhouse upper regions;
Where, in the eighteen-penny gallery,
Irish nymphs learn Irish raillery ...

=== Oliver Wendell Holmes Sr. ===
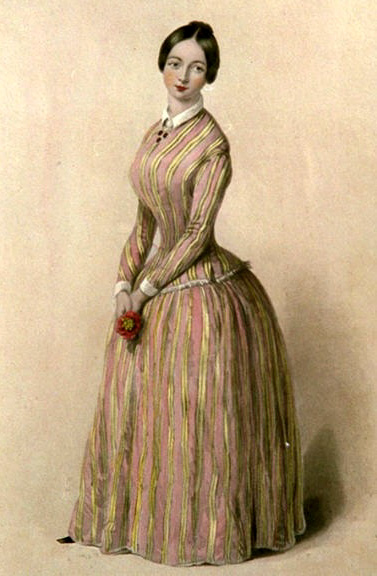
Idealized portrayal of a 19th-century grisette by Robert Richard Scanlan.

Swift's diatribe is in considerable contrast to the elegiac La Grisette, by Oliver Wendell Holmes a century later. Written in 1836, shortly after he had returned to Boston from his medical studies in Paris, it expresses not only nostalgia for the young woman who had been his lover but also for Paris itself and all that it represented. It was a nostalgia shared by many of his American contemporaries who had studied there. Holmes' description of Clemence reflects a frequent 19th century perception of the grisette as an attentive and self-effacing companion to the starving artists and romantic students of bohemia. Her early death, alluded to in the poem, was not unusual. Many grisettes died of tuberculosis both in real life and in their fictional portrayals, e.g. Mimi in Scènes de la vie de Bohème and Fantine in Les Misérables.

Extract from La Grisette (1836):

Ah Clemence! when I saw thee last
Trip down the Rue de Seine,
And turning, when thy form had past,
I said, "We meet again,"—
I dreamed not in that idle glance
Thy latest image came,
And only left to memory's trance
A shadow and a name.

The few strange words my lips had taught
Thy timid voice to speak,
Their gentler signs, which often brought
Fresh roses to thy cheek,
The trailing of thy long loose hair
Bent o'er my couch of pain,
All, all returned, more sweet, more fair;
Oh, had we met again! ...

== Mark Twain's opinions ==
Illustration of "the over-estimated grisette" in Mark Twain's Innocents Abroad

"The Over-estimated Grisette" (excerpt from Chapter XV of Mark Twain's 1869 Innocents Abroad):

Ah, the grisettes! I had almost forgotten. They are another romantic fraud. They were (if you let the books of travel tell it) always so beautiful—so neat and trim, so graceful—so naive and trusting—so gentle, so winning—so faithful to their shop duties, so irresistible to buyers in their prattling importunity—so devoted to their poverty-stricken students of the Latin Quarter—so lighthearted and happy on their Sunday picnics in the suburbs—and oh, so charmingly, so delightfully immoral!

Stuff! For three or four days I was constantly saying:

"Quick, Ferguson! Is that a grisette?"

And he always said, "No."

He comprehended at last that I wanted to see a grisette. Then he showed me dozens of them. They were like nearly all the Frenchwomen I ever saw—homely. They had large hands, large feet, large mouths; they had pug noses as a general thing, and moustaches that not even good breeding could overlook; they combed their hair straight back without parting; they were ill-shaped, they were not winning, they were not graceful; I knew by their looks that they ate garlic and onions; and lastly and finally, to my thinking it would be base flattery to call them immoral.

Aroint thee, wench! I sorrow for the vagabond student of the Latin Quarter now, even more than formerly I envied him. Thus topples to earth another idol of my infancy.

== See also ==
- Maja

== Further sources ==
- 'Grisettes' in France in the Age of Les Miserables, Mount Holyoke College. Retrieved 8 March 2008.
- 'Kindly Laws make "Mimi Pinson" Unhappy', New York Times, March 20, 1910. Retrieved in PDF format 8 March 2008.
- Max Nordau 'The Grisette' (1890) in On Bohemia: The Code of the Self-Exiled (César Graña ed.), Transaction Publishers, 1990, pp. 275–276. Retrieved 9 March 2008.
- Mrs. Postans, 'Sketches of Parisian Life: The Grisette' in The Illuminated Magazine, Vol. 2, November–April, 1844 (Douglas William Jerrold ed.), pp. 192–195. Retrieved 9 March 2008.
- Hoog Naginski, Isabelle (May 1, 2005). "Accidental families: ritual and initiation in Horace and La Comtesse de Rudolstadt". The Romanic Review. Archived from the original on May 17, 2011.
- Alain Lescart, 'Splendeurs et Misères de la Grisette. Evolution d'une figure Emblématique' Paris : Honoré Champion, 2008, 333 p.
