= Ian Jack (literary scholar) =

Ian Robert James Jack, FBA (5 December 1923 – 3 September 2008) was a British academic. He was Reader in English Poetry at the University of Cambridge from 1973 to 1976 and Professor from 1976 to 1989.
