= William Holland (publisher) =

London print seller

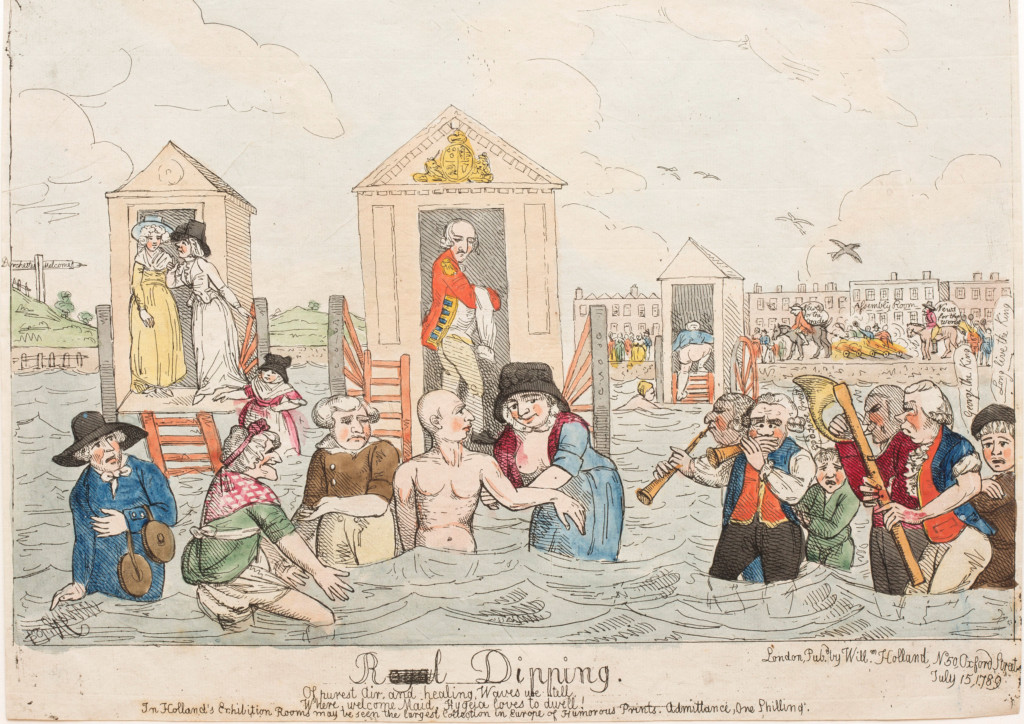
Royal Dipping by John Colley Nixon, published by Holland 1789

William Holland (1757 to 1815 in London) was a leading London print seller and radical publisher who was fined £100 and imprisoned in 1793 for a year for seditious libel.

== Biography ==
Holland's antecedents are obscure, though David Alexander suggests he may have been of Irish origin, as hinted by his pseudonym Paddy Whack.

Holland began selling prints in a shop at 66 Drury Lane in 1782 and published a number of prints during the 1784 election. He move to new premises at 50 Oxford Street in 1788, where he charged 1s for admittance to his 'Museum of Graphic Genius'. Holland's successful business grew and his list included works by Frederick George Byron, George Murgatroyd Woodward, and John Nixon, as well as James Gillray and Thomas Rowlandson. A radical, he was prosecuted in 1793 on charges of seditious libel for selling a copy of Thomas Paine's Letter Addressed to the Addressers and imprisoned in Newgate Prison where he encountered Lord George Gordon and other radicals and communicated with John Horne Tooke. During this time his print shop was run by Richard Newton, a talented young caricaturist who Holland published until 1797.

A surviving copy of his 1794 catalogue Holland's Catalogue of Humorous Prints, &C to be had at his Museum of Graphic Genius, No 50 Oxford Street, London lists 116 prints and is a rare example of an 18th Century printseller's catalogue and provides interesting insights into his output. The list includes prices as well as hints as to their possible use ("an admirable print for a chimney piece," "fit for screens," etc.); many of the prints can be identified as prints in the Catalogue of Political and Personal Satires Preserved in the Department of Prints and Drawings in the British Museum. Other Holland catalogues dating to 1778, 1789, 1791, and 1792 are found as advertisements in the backs of his books.

In late 1802, Holland moved his shop again, to 11 Cockspur Street, and gradually shifted his stock from political caricatures to more expensive prints.

His obituary appeared in 1815 in the Gentlemen's Magazine: "At the Hummuns Covent-garden, a few minutes after coming out of the warm bath.. an eminent publisher of caricatures, and patron of Woodward, Rowlandson, Newton, Buck and other artists. He was himself a man of genius and wrote many popular songs, and a volume of poetry, besides being the author of the pointed and epigrammatic words which accompanied most of his caricatures." This is borne out by the lettering in Hollands's distinctive and somewhat erratic hand on many of his published prints.

== See also ==
- Richard Newton
- Thomas Rowlandson
- George Moutard Woodward
