= Jane Harvey (writer) =

Tyneside poet and novelist

Jane Harvey (1771–1848) was a Tyneside poet and novelist. She wrote both fiction and nonfiction, sometimes anonymously, and is best known for her romantic novels.

== Biography ==
Jane Harvey was likely born in 1771 and was baptized in Gateshead on the 8 July 1771. She was either born to Elizabeth and Lawrence Harvey of Barnard Castle, or William and Jane Harvey.

In 1794 Harvey wrote A Sentimental Tour through Newcastle, credited to 'A Young Lady' which she published through subscription. This was a guide to various aspects of the city, and includes political comment on various topics. In 1797, she would release a book of poetry, Poems on Various Subjects, which included topics such as, a ballad she wrote at the age of 15, praise of Anna Seward, Charlotte Smith and Helen Maria Williams and Spenserian stanzas about her childhood, among others.

Harvey continued to publish poetry and Hymns throughout her life, but she is probably best known for her romantic novels, especially The Castle of Tynemouth published in 1806. Her books were widely circulated and are well represented in surviving catalogues of private collections and libraries. However, critical reaction was sometimes more negative, such as in a review for The Governor of Belleville in The Flowers of Literature which says "that there are two volumes too much of it" and while there was "some ingenuity in the design, [...] it [was] sadly wrought up, the author being lamentably deficient in the knowledge of character.' The last book she wrote was the 1841 Fugitive Pieces which combined "charming poetry" political support for striking Keelmen and exploited female tailors.

Little is known of Harvey's life but multiple obituaries in Newcastle newspapers seem to show that she maintained a circulating library in Tynemouth for many years. She died on 4 March 1848 and was buried in the Newcastle's general cemetery, Jesmond, on 6 March.
