= List of humor magazines =

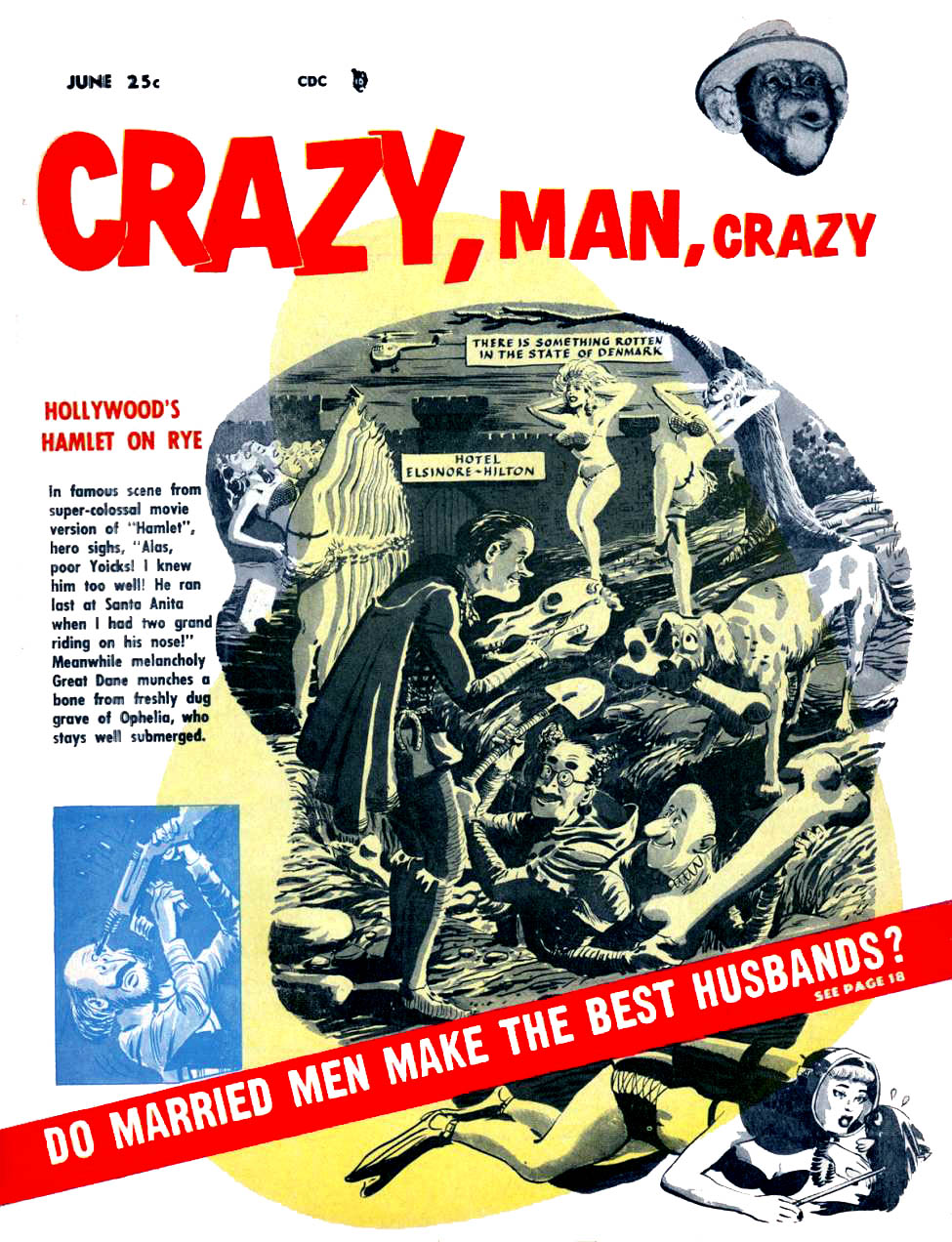
An edition of American humor magazine Crazy, Man, Crazy from 1956

A humor magazine is a magazine specifically designed to deliver humorous content to its readership. These publications often offer satire and parody, but some also put an emphasis on cartoons, caricature, absurdity, one-liners, witty aphorisms, surrealism, neuroticism, gelotology, emotion-regulating humor, and/or humorous essays. Humor magazines first became popular in the early 19th century with specimens like Le Charivari (1832–1937) in France, Punch (1841–2002) in the United Kingdom and Vanity Fair (1859–1863) in the United States.

== Contemporary humor magazines ==
Title	Language	Country	Year founded	Notable Contributors	Frequency	Medium	Classification
Academia Cațavencu	Romanian	Romania	1991	Mircea Dinescu, Sorin Ovidiu Vântu	Weekly	Paper	Satire
The American Bystander	English	US	2015	Michael Gerber, Brian McConnachie, Jack Handey, Kate Beaton	Quarterly	Paper and Online	Satire, Parody
The Brown Jug	English	US	1920	S.J. Perelman, Nathanael West, Jordan Carlos, Ben "Bean Kid" Doyle	Quarterly	Paper	Satire
Le Canard enchaîné	French	France	1915	René Pétillon, Jean Effel, Cabu, Lefred Thouron	Weekly	Paper	Satire, cartoons
Charlie Hebdo	French	France	1969	Philippe Val, François Cavanna, Cabu, Le Professeur Choron	Weekly	Paper	Satire, cartoons
The Civilian	English	New Zealand	2013	Ben Uffindell	varied	Online	Satire
The Clinic	Spanish	Chile	1998	Patricio Fernández Chadwick	Weekly	Paper	Satire
CollegeHumor	English	US	1999	Ricky Van Veen, Jake Hurwitz, Amir Blumenfeld, Streeter Seidell	Daily	Online	Humor
The Comic News	English	US	1984	Thom Zajac, John Govsky	Monthly	Paper	Political Cartoons
The Cornell Lunatic	English	US	1978	Joey Green, Adam-Troy Castro, Naren Shankar	2 per year	Paper	Satire
Cracked.com	English	US	2009	Jack O'Brien, Seanbaby, Daniel O'Brien	Daily	Online	Humor
The Daily Currant	English	US	2012		Varied	Online	Satire
The Daily Mash	English	UK	2007	Paul Stokes, Neil Rafferty	Daily	Online	Satire
Dartmouth Jack-O-Lantern	English	US	1908	Dr. Seuss, Buck Henry, Chris Miller, Mindy Kaling	4 per year	Paper	Satire
The Michigan Every Three Weekly	English	US	1997	Megan Ganz	Monthly	Paper and Online	Satire
Eulenspiegel-Das Satiremagazin	German	East Germany, Germany	1946	Mathias Wedel	Monthly	Paper	Satire
Faking News	English	India	2008	Rahul Roushan	Daily	Online	Satire
Fish Rap Live!	English	US	1985	Skyler Hanrath, Ryan Schreiber	9 per year	Paper	Satire, absurdism, theme issues
Frank	English	Canada	1987	Michael Coren, Michael Bate, David Bentley, Fabrice Taylor	Biweekly	Paper	Satire
Frigidaire	Italian	Italy	1980	Andrea Pazienza, Tanino Liberatore, Vincenzo Sparagna, Massimo Mattioli	Monthly	Paper	Comics
Funny Times	English	US	1985	Susan Wolpert, Raymond Lesser	Monthly	Paper	Satire, cartoons
The Georgetown Heckler	English	US	2003	Jack O'Brien	varied	Paper	Satire
Le Gorafi	French	France	2012	Jean-René Buissière	Daily	Online	Satire
Grönköpings Veckoblad	Swedish	Sweden	1902	Nils Hasselskog	Monthly	Paper	Satire
Harvard Lampoon	English	US	1876	Doug Kenney, George Meyer, Conan O'Brien, Robert Benchley, Kurt Andersen, John Updike	Five per year	Paper	Satire
Heuristic Squelch	English	US	1991		6–8 per year	Paper	Satire
Humor Times	English	US	1991	Will Durst, Dan Piraro, Ruben Bolling	Monthly	Paper	Satire
The Inconsequential	English	UK	2005	Graham C Hodgson, Stephen McCartney	Quarterly	Paper (2005) Online (2012)	Satire, Verse, Short Stories, Cartoons, Absurdism
Jester of Columbia	English	US	1901–1997, 2005	Allen Ginsberg, Joseph L. Mankiewicz, Tony Kushner, Ted Rall	Quarterly	Paper	Satire, absurdism
El Jueves	Spanish	Spain	1977	Joan Vizcarra, J.L. Martín, Jordi Sellas	Weekly	Paper	Satire
The Lemon Press (University of York)	English	UK	2009	Joe Regan, Ryan Fitzgerald, Chris Burgess, Dave Walker	4 or 5 times per year	Paper	Satire
Light	English	US	1992	X. J. Kennedy, Willard R. Espy, Tom Disch, John Updike	Quarterly	Paper (1992–2012) Online (2012–)	Light verse
Mad	English	US	1952	Harvey Kurtzman, Al Jaffee, Sergio Aragonés, Mort Drucker	Monthly (1952–2009), Quarterly (2009-2012), Bi-monthly (2012-)	Paper	Satire; comics
McSweeney's Internet Tendency	English	US	1998	Dave Eggers, Michael Ian Black, Tim Carvell, Nick Hornby	Daily	Online	Satire
The Milking Cat	English	US	2018		Weekly	Online	Teen Humor, Satire, Comics
Nebelspalter	German	Switzerland	1875	René Gilsi, Franz Hohler, Heinrich Danioth, Marco Ratschiller	Weekly	magazine	Satire
Neurococi	Romanian	Romania	2018	Radu Barsan	Daily	Online	Satire, Parody
Nonsense	English	US	1983	Butch D'Ambrosio, Billy Scafuri, John Milhiser, Serious Lunch	6 times a year	Paper (1983-2011), Online (2012-present)	Satire, Parody
Noseweek	English	South Africa	1993	Martin Welz	Monthly	magazine	Satire
Onion.com	English	US	1996	David Javerbaum, Ben Karlin, Scott Dikkers, Carol Kolb	daily	Online	Satire
The Oxymoron	English	UK	2008		3 per year	Paper	Satire
The Pennsylvania Punch Bowl	English	US	1899	Ezra Pound, Morton Livingston Schamberg, John Valentine Lovitt, Leo Yanoff	3 per year	Paper (1899) Online (2007)	Satire
The Phoenix	English	Ireland	1983	Paddy Prendeville, John Mulcahy	Fortnightly	Paper	Satire, Politics
The Plumber's Faucet	English	Canada	1984		Triweekly	Paper and online	Humor, satire, cartoons
Phroth	English	US	1909		2 per year	Paper	Satire, humor
Points in Case	English	US	1999	Amir Blumenfeld	Daily	Online	Satire, humor
Princeton Tiger	English	US	1882	Booth Tarkington, F. Scott Fitzgerald, Robert Caro, John McPhee	Quarterly	Paper (1882–) Online (2009–)	Satire
Private Eye	English	UK	1961	Peter Cook, Ian Hislop, Richard Ingrams, John Wells	Biweekly	Paper	Satire
De Rechtzetting (The Correction)	Flemish	Netherlands	2010	Indiyan	Daily	Online	Fake News
De Speld (The Pin)	Dutch	Netherlands	2007		Daily	Online	Fake News
Satyr Magazine	English	US	1970		Daily	Online	Satire
Savage Henry Independent Times	English	US	2010	Sarah Godlin, Sonny Wong (artist), Zack Newkirk, Chris Durant	Monthly	Paper, Online	Satire
The Serpopard	English	US & Germany	2017	Luger James, Ricarda Stevenson, Andrea Julia Smith, Zac de la Vigne	Daily	Online	Satire
The Stanford Chaparral	English	US	1899	Josh Weinstein, Doodles Weaver, Frank Thomas, Ollie Johnston	6 per year	Paper	Satire
Stanford Flipside	English	US	2008		Monthly	Online	Satire
Svikmøllen	Danish	Denmark	1915	Sven Brasch	Annual	Paper	Satire
Titanic	German	Germany	1979	Martin Sonneborn	Monthly	Paper	Satire
The UnReal Times	English	India	2011	Ashwin Kumar, CS Krishna, Karthik Laxman, Ajayendar Reddy	Daily	Online	Satire
Viz	English	UK	1979	Chris Donald, Simon Donald, Joel Morris, Christina Martin	6 per year	Paper	Comics
The Yale Record	English	US	1872	Garry Trudeau, Cole Porter, Peter Arno, Vincent Price	8 per year	Paper	Satire, cartoons
The Zamboni	English	US	1989	Josh Wolk, Luke Burns, Graham Starr	Monthly	Paper (1989–)/Online (2014–)	Humor. Satire, Installation Art, Parody, Cartoons, Mixed Media, sketch
Toons Mag	English	Norway	2009	Arifur Rahman	Daily	Online	Cartoon, Comics, Caricature, Satire
Blandaren	Swedish	Sweden	1863	Pontus Hultén, Gunnar Asplund	Annually	Paper	dadaistic, absurdist, satirical and surrealist

== Out-of-print humor magazines ==
Title	Language	Country	Years published	Notable Contributors	Frequency	Medium	Classification
Army Man	English	US	1988–1990	George Meyer, John Swartzwelder, Jack Handey, Mark O'Donnell	3 issues	Paper	Satire
L'Asino (The Donkey)	Italian	Italy	1892–1925	Guido Podrecca (Goliardo), Giosuè Carducci, Gabriele Galantara (Ratalanga)	Weekly	Paper	Satire
Bałamut (Philanderer)	Polish	Russian Empire	1830–1832/36	Michal Konarski, Józef Ignacy Kraszewski	Weekly	Paper	Satire
Il Becco Giallo (Yellow Beak)	Italian	Italy	1924–1926	Alberto Giannini	Weekly	Paper	Satire
El Be Negre (The Black Sheep)	Catalan	Second Spanish Republic	1931–1936	Josep Maria Planes i Martí, Amadeu Hurtado	Weekly	Paper	Satire
Bertoldo	Italian	Italy	1920s–1930s	Saul Steinberg, Marcello Marchesi	Weekly	Paper	Surrealist Humor
The Blind Man	English	US	1917–1917	Marcel Duchamp, Henri-Pierre Roché, Beatrice Wood, Mina Loy	2 issues	Paper	Dada, Humor, Art
California Pelican	English	US	1903–1988	Rube Goldberg, Ron Goulart, Earle C. Anthony	8 per year	Paper	Satire
La Campana de Gràcia (Gràcia's Bell)	Catalan, Spanish	Spain	1870–1934	Innocenci López i Bernagosi, Prudenci Bertrana, Antoni Serra	Weekly	Paper	Satire
Cannibale (Cannibal)	Italian	Italy	1977–1979	Stefano Tamburini, Massimo Mattioli, Filippo Scòzzari, Andrea Pazienza	Varied (9 issues)	Paper	Satire, Underground Comics
The Caricature Magazine or Hudibrastic Mirror	English	England	1806-1818?	G.M.Woodward, Thomas Rowlandson, Charles Williams, Isaac Cruikshank, George Cruikshank, William Elmes, Piercy Roberts	Biweekly	Paper	Satire
La Caricature	French	France	1830–1843	Charles Philipon, Louis Desnoyers, Honoré de Balzac, Grandville	Weekly	Paper	Satire
CARtoons Magazine	English	US	Ca. 1959–1991	William Stout, Alex Toth, Russ Manning	8 times a year	Paper	Cartoons
Cartoon Magazine	English	US	Ca. 1900–1912	Clifford Berryman, Homer Davenport		Paper	Satire, Political cartoons
Casseta Popular	Portuguese	Brazil	1978–1992	Beto Silva, Marcelo Madureira, Helio de la Peña		Paper	Satire, parody
Le Charivari	French	France	1832–1937	Charles Philipon, Honoré Daumier, Gustave Doré, Nadar	Daily (1832–1936)/Weekly (1937)	Paper	Satire, cartoons
Charley Jones' Laugh Book Magazine	English	US	1943–1960s	Bill Ward, Al Wiseman	Monthly	Paper	Cartoons; verse; jokes
The Chaser	English	Australia	1999–2005		Fortnightly	Paper	Satirical news
Le Chat Noir (The Black Cat)	French	France	1882–1897	Rodolphe Salis, Jean Lorrain, Paul Verlaine, Jean Richepin	Weekly	Paper	Satire
Chunklet	English	US	1993–2005	Henry Owings		Paper	alternative humor, parody
El Coitao (Sex)	Spanish	Spain	1908–1908	Miguel de Unamuno, Gustavo de Maeztu, Tomás Meabe, José Arruda	Weekly (7 issues)	Paper	Satire
Cracked	English	US	1958–2007	Will Elder, John Severin, Daniel Clowes, Jack Davis	Monthly	Paper	Satire; comics
Le Crapouillot	French	France	1915–1996	Jean Galtier-Boissière, Roland Gaucher		Paper	Satire
Crazy Magazine	English	US	1973–1983	Stan Lee, Will Eisner, Art Buchwald, Harlan Ellison	Monthly	Paper	Satire; comics
¡Cu-Cut! (Cuckoo!)	Catalan	Spain	1902–1912	Josep Abril i Virgili, Joan Junceda, Lola Anglada, Bagaria		Paper	Satire
Cyrulik Warszawski (The Barber of Warsaw)	Polish	Poland	1926–1934	Jan Lechon, Jerzy Paczkowski, Marian Hemar, Julian Tuwim	Weekly	Paper	Satire
L'Esquella de la Torratxa	Catalan	Spain	1872–1939	Prudenci Bertrana, Pere Calders, Santiago Rusiñol, Isidre Nonell	Weekly	Paper	Satire
The eXile	English	Russia	1997–2008	Matt Taibbi, Mark Ames	Biweekly	Paper	Satire
Feral Tribune	Croatian	Yugoslavia, Croatia	1984–1993	Viktor Ivančić, Boris Dežulović, Drago Hedl	Weekly	Paper	Satire
Fliegende Blätter (Flying Leaves)	German	Germany	1845–1944	Wilhelm Busch, Julius Klinger, Hermann Vogel, Count Franz Pocci	Weekly	Paper	Satire
Fun	English	UK	1861–1901	W. S. Gilbert, Ambrose Bierce, H.J. Byron, Matt Morgan	Weekly	Paper	Satire
Girgir (Broom)	Turkish	Turkey	1972–1993	Oğuz Aral, M. K. Perker, tr:Tekin AralTekin Aral, Galip Tekin, Ergün Gündüz	Weekly	Paper	Satire
Hara-Kiri	French	France	1960–2000; (banned in 1961 and 1966)	Georges Bernier, François Cavanna, Fred, Jean-Marc Reiser	Monthly	Paper	Satire, cartoons
Help!	English	US	1960–1965	Harvey Kurtzman, Terry Gilliam, Woody Allen, Robert Crumb	Monthly	Paper	Satire
Humbug	English	US	1957–1958	Harvey Kurtzman, Wally Wood, Will Elder, Al Jaffee, Larry Siegel	Monthly	Paper	Satire, parody
Judge	English	US	1881–1947, 1953	S.J. Perelman, Harold Ross, James Albert Wales, Victor Lasky	Weekly, Monthly from 1932–1947	Paper	Satire
Judy	English	United Kingdom	1867–1907	Alfred Bryan, Adelaide Claxton, Charles Henry Ross, Marie Duval	Weekly	Paper	Satire
Karuzela (Carousel)	Polish	Poland	1957–1992	Jerzy Wróblewski, Adam Ochocki, Stanisław Gratkowski, Jacek Sawaszkiewicz	Biweekly	Paper	Satire
Krokodil (Crocodile)	Russian	Soviet Union, Russia	1922–2006	Vladimir Mayakovsky, Kukryniksy, Yuliy Ganf	3 per month	Paper	Satire
Liberum Veto	Polish	Polish Galicia in the Austro-Hungarian Empire	1903–1906	Franciszek Czaki		Paper	Satire
Life	English	US	1883–1936	Charles Dana Gibson, Robert Benchley, Dorothy Parker, Robert E. Sherwood	Weekly	Paper	Humor and General Interest
Il Male (Evil)	Italian	Italy	1977–1982	Pino Zac, Vincino, Angelo Pasquini, Cinzia Leone	Weekly	Paper	Satire
Modern Humorist	English	US	2000–2003	John Aboud, Michael Colton, John Warner, Daniel Chun	Daily	Online	Satire
Marc'Aurelio	Italian	Italy	1931–1958	Federico Fellini, Castellano & Pipolo, Ettore Scola, Furio Scarpelli	Daily	Paper	Satire
Molla Nasraddin	Azeri, Russian	Russian Empire, Persian Socialist Soviet Republic, Azerbaijan Soviet Socialist Republic	1906–1931	Jalil Mammadguluzadeh		Paper	Satire
Monocle	English	US	1950s–1965	Victor Navasky, Calvin Trillin, C. D. B. Bryan, Neil Postman	Monthly	Paper	Satire
Moskovskaya Komsomolka	Russian	Russia	1999–2001	Boris Berezovsky, Dmitry Bykov, Eduard Limonov, Marina Lesko	Weekly	Paper	Satire
Mucha (The Fly)	Polish	Poland	1868–1939; 1946–1952	Antoni Orłowski, Franciszek Kostrzewski, Boleslaw Prus	Monthly	Paper	Satire
National Lampoon	English	US	1970–1998	Douglas Kenney, Michael O'Donoghue, John Hughes, Bruce McCall, Henry Beard, Mike Reiss, Larry Sloman, Shary Flenniken, Dan Clowes, Chris Ware	Monthly	Paper	Satire
Nickelodeon Magazine	English	US	1990–2010	Art Spiegelman, Gahan Wilson, Robert Leighton, Robert Sikoryak	Quarterly (1990–1994); 6 per year (1994–1995); 10 per year (1995–2010)	Paper	Children's Magazine (1990); Humor, Comics (1993–2010)
Omnibus	Italian	Italy	1937–1939	Leo Longanesi, Mino Maccari, Alberto Savinio, Eugenio Montale	Weekly	Paper	Satire
The Onion	English	US	1988–2013	Scott Dikkers, Carol Kolb, David Javerbaum, Ben Karlin	weekly	Paper	Satire
Panic	English	US	1954–1956	Al Feldstein, Wally Wood, Basil Wolverton, Will Elder	monthly	Paper	Satire, cartoons, parody
Pèl & Ploma (Hair & Feather)	Catalan	Spain	1899–1903	Ramon Casas, Miquel Utrillo, Emili Vilanova and March, Eduard Marquina i Angulo	Monthly (1899–1900), Bimonthly (1900–1901), Monthly (1901–1903)	Paper	Literature, Art, Satire
Politicks	English	US	Ca. 1977–1979	Dick Morris		Paper	Satire
Przegięcie Pały	Polish	Poland	1988–1989	Krzysztof Skiba, Paweł Konnak, Piotr Trzaskalski	Quarterly	Paper	Satire
Puck	English, German	US	1871–1918	Joseph Ferdinand Keppler, Livingston Hopkins, Frederick Burr Opper, Rose O'Neill	Weekly	Paper	Satire; comics
Punch	English	UK	1841–2002	A. A. Milne, P. G. Wodehouse, William Makepeace Thackeray, Kingsley Amis	Weekly	Paper	Satire
Quatre Gats (Four Cats)	Catalan	Spain	1899–1899	Santiago Rusiñol i Prats, Ramon Casas i Carbó, Joaquim Mir i Trinxet, Josep Puig i Cadafalch	15 issues	Paper	Satire, Literature, Art
The Realist	English	US	1958–2001	Paul Krassner, Lenny Bruce, Terry Southern, Ken Kesey	Weekly	Paper	Satire
Różowe Domino (Pink Dominoes)	Polish	Austro-Hungarian Empire	1882–1890	Maria Konopnicka, Włodzimierz Zagórski, W. Maniecki, AJ Waruszyński	Weekly	Paper	Satire
Sick	English	US	1960–1980	Joe Simon, Angelo Torres, Jack Davis, Bob Powell	Monthly	Paper	Satire
Simplicissimus	German	Germany	1896–1967	Thomas Mann, Rainer Maria Rilke, Hermann Hesse, Thomas Theodor Heine	Weekly; Biweekly (1964–1967)	Paper	Satire
Spy	English	US	1986–1998	Kurt Andersen, Graydon Carter, Patricia Marx, Mark O'Donnell, Lisa Birnbach, Larissa MacFarquhar, Louis Theroux, Paul Simms, Paul Rudnick, Walter Kirn	Monthly	Paper	Satire
Szpilki (Studs)	Polish	Poland	1935–1994	Zbigniew Mitzner, Eryk Lipiński, Jan Galuba, Andrzej Dudziński		Paper	Satire
Trump	English	US	1957–1957	Harvey Kurtzman, Wally Wood, Al Jaffee, Arnold Roth, Will Elder		Paper	parody, satire, cartoon
Ulk (Practical Joke)	German	Germany	1872–1933	Hans Reimann, Kurt Tucholsky, Lyonel Feininger, Heinrich Zille	Weekly	Paper	Satire
Vanity Fair	English	US	1859–1863	Thomas Bailey Aldrich, William Dean Howells, Fitz James O'Brien, Charles Farrar Browne	Weekly	Paper	Satire, Political cartoons
Vim Magazine	English	US	Ca. 1898–?	Leon Barritt		Paper	Satire, Political cartoons
Weekly World News	English	US	1979–2007	Bob Lind, Ed Anger, Ernie Colón	Weekly	Paper	Fake News, Tabloid
Wiadomości Brukowe (Paving News)	Polish	Poland	1816–1822	Towarzystwo Szubrawców (The Society of Rogues)	Weekly	Paper	Satire, Political cartoons
The Wits Magazine and Attic Miscellany	English	England	1818-1818	Thomas Rowlandson, George Cruikshank	Monthly	Paper	Humour
