= The Caricature Magazine or Hudibrastic Mirror =

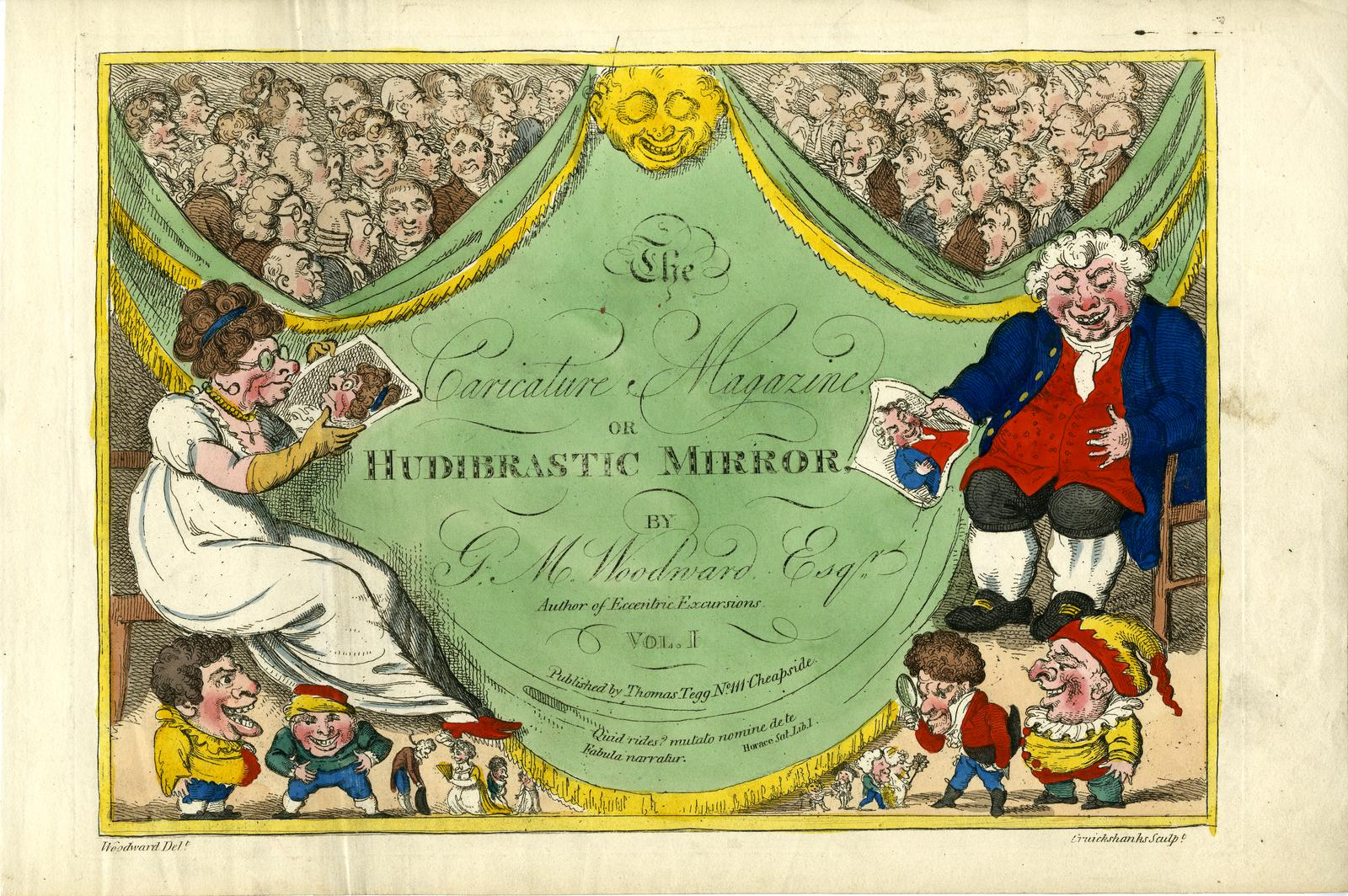
- Cover of Volume 1 of The Caricature magazine, c1809
- Editor: George Moutard Woodward
- Categories: Politics, humour, satire
- Frequency: Fortnightly
- Founder: George Moutard Woodward; Thomas Tegg
- Founded: 1806
- First issue: 09 September 1806
- Final issue: 1819
- Country: United Kingdom
- Based in: London
- Language: English

The Caricature Magazine or Hudibrastic Mirror was a British fortnightly magazine of humorous and satirical prints, first issued in 1806 by London publisher Thomas Tegg, and edited by George Woodward, the comic author and caricaturist, upon whose designs many of its prints were originally based. The British artist Thomas Rowlandson was a leading contributor and took over its direction after Woodward's death in 1809. The magazine's lively coloured designs by leading caricaturists of the day and comparatively low pricing were an immediate success and Tegg continued to publish the magazine until 1819. Tegg also reissued back numbers as bound volumes; prints from these volumes survive in quite large numbers and are among the best known surviving Georgian social caricatures.

== History ==
=== Woodward's Caricature Magazine ===
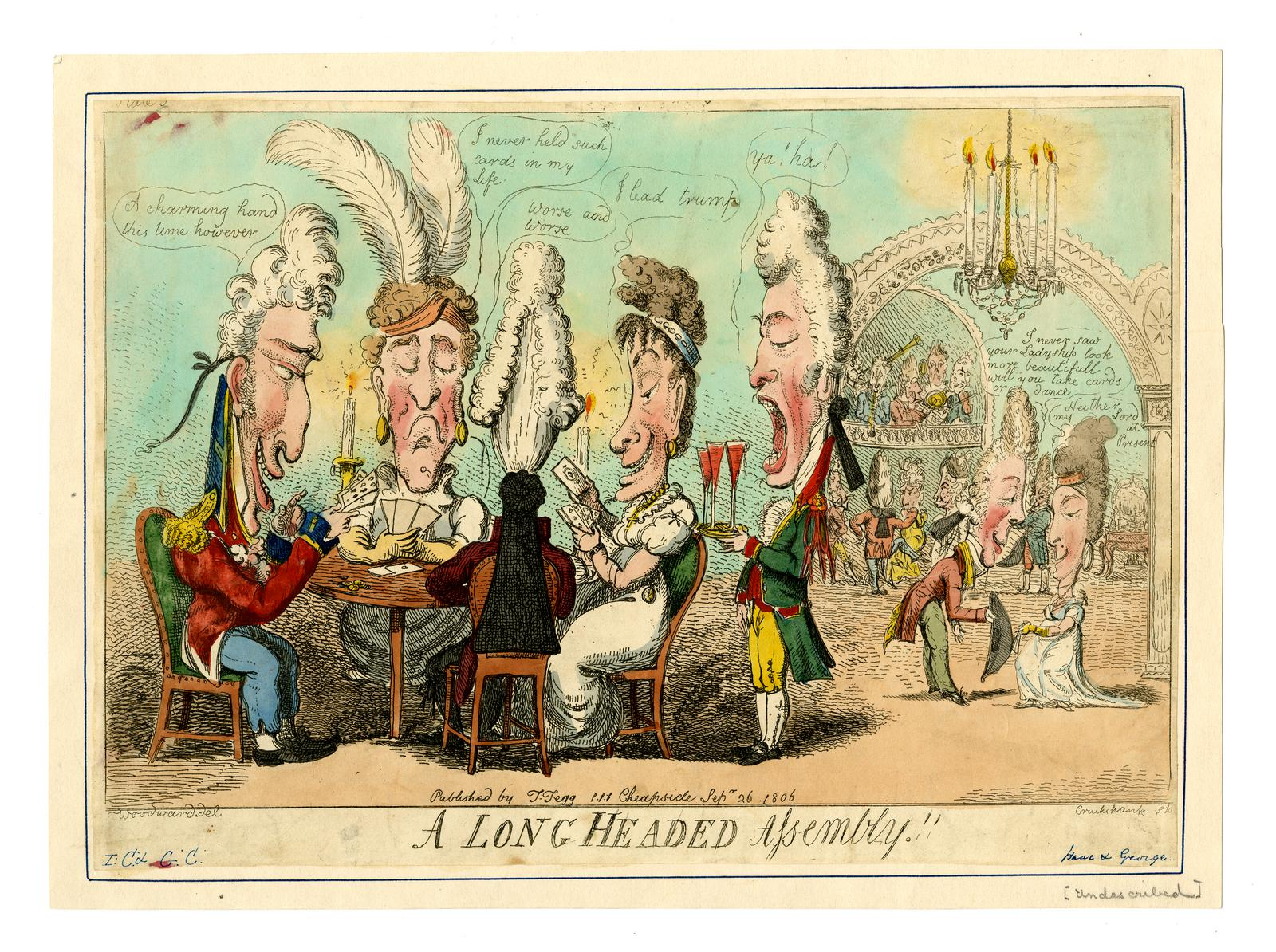
Isaac Cruikshank after G.M.Woodward A Long Headed Assembly 1807 Caricature Magazine (British Museum)

The magazine was launched in 1806, offered on subscription, and advertised widely by Thomas Tegg in magazines such as The Monthly Magazine, Monthly Literary Recreations, and The Sun. A short-lived but successful precursor, The Laughable Magazine, seems to have been launched by Rowlandson in May 1806 before Rowlandson and Woodward joined forces to produce The Caricature Magazine. No surviving intact copies of The Laughable Magazine are recorded but a surviving title page, similar in design to one later used by The Caricature Magazine, indicates that it offered prints by Rowlandson after "Sir Edmund Bunbury". This was probably Sir Edward Henry Bunbury, second son of William Henry Bunbury, the caricaturist. Some of the prints from the Laughable Magazine can be found in the British Museum and elsewhere; many relate to popular songs, for example, Black, Brown and Fair. The Laughable Magazine is also advertised on the wrappers for the original issue in parts of The Caricature Magazine. Tegg continued to advertise The Caricature Magazine heavily over the next few years, and judging by the number of surviving prints from it, it had a relatively large circulation.

Each issue of The Caricature Magazine comprised two caricatures in a blue paper wrapper, initially priced at 'two shillings coloured, one shilling plain'. The prints were straightforward etchings without aquatint, all of a similar size around 12 x 8 1/2 inches and could made quickly and be used in large print runs. The wrapper was printed in black on front and back; the front had a woodblock vignette of four Lilliputian figures, surrounded by a letterpress inscription : 'The Caricature Magazine or Hudibrastic Mirror containing a most capital collection of Caricatures from original drawings by G.M.Woodward, Esq, Author of Eccentric Excursions in England and Wales and engraved by Mr Rowlandson, Author of the Laughable Magazine'. Further publication details below the vignette listed the London bookshops that stocked the magazine. The back of the wrapper had advertisements for some of Tegg's other publications. Examples of the first sixteen issues of the Caricature magazine in their original wrappers survive in the Huntington Library Pasadena and in the collection of William A Gordon of Glencoe, Illinois.

=== Contributors ===
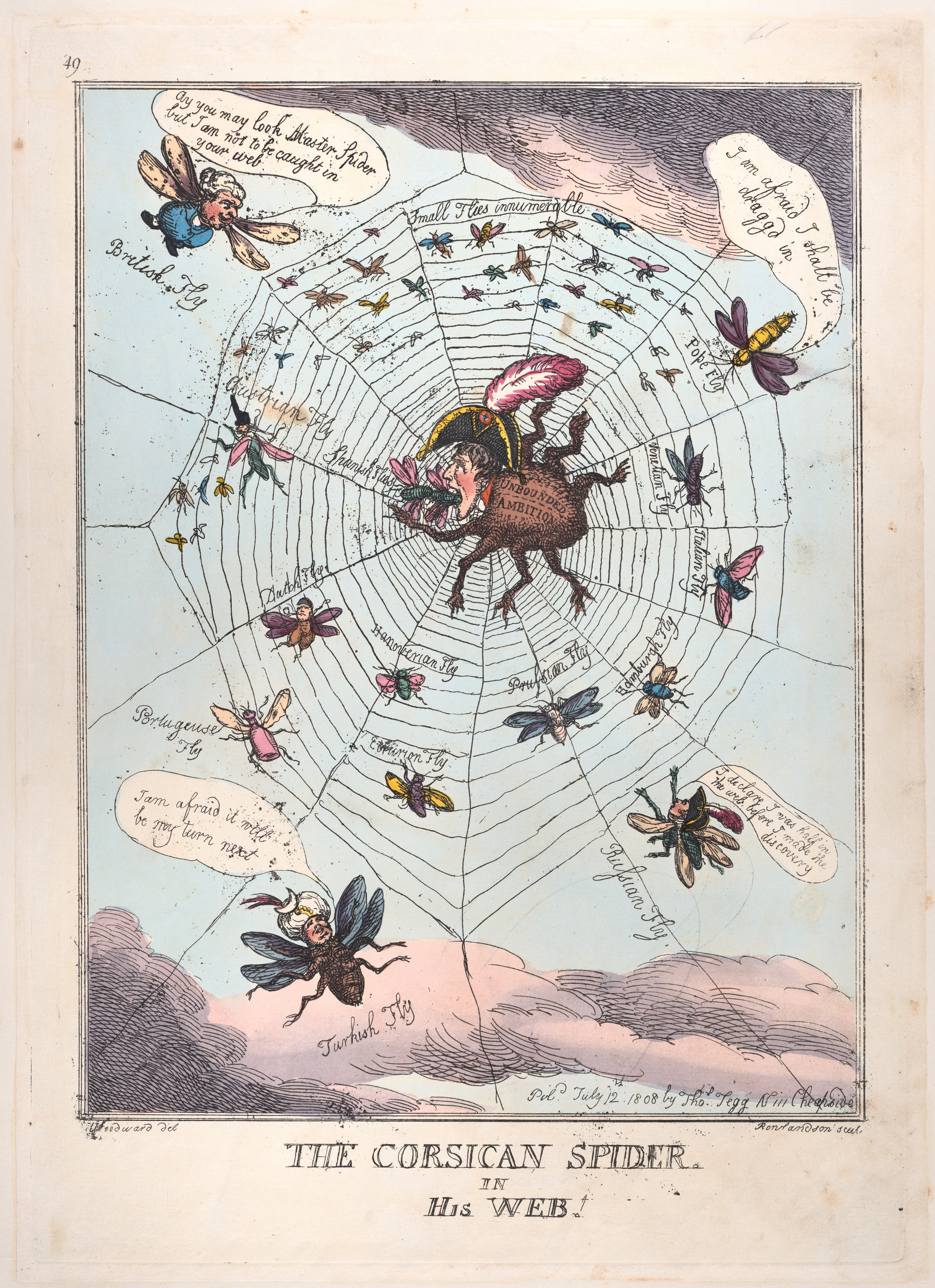
Thomas Rowlandson The Corsican Spider in his Web (1808) Caricature Magazine (Metropolitan Museum)

Although Woodward was widely known to his contemporaries as a popular comic author, as an artist and caricaturist he was only an amateur. He served as an 'ideas man' for the magazine, making rough sketches of satires and devising jokes which were then transformed into etchings by Rowlandson and others. Woodward had previously devised a large number of designs for caricatures for Samuel William Fores and others as well as to illustrate his own books such as Eccentric Excursions (1796).

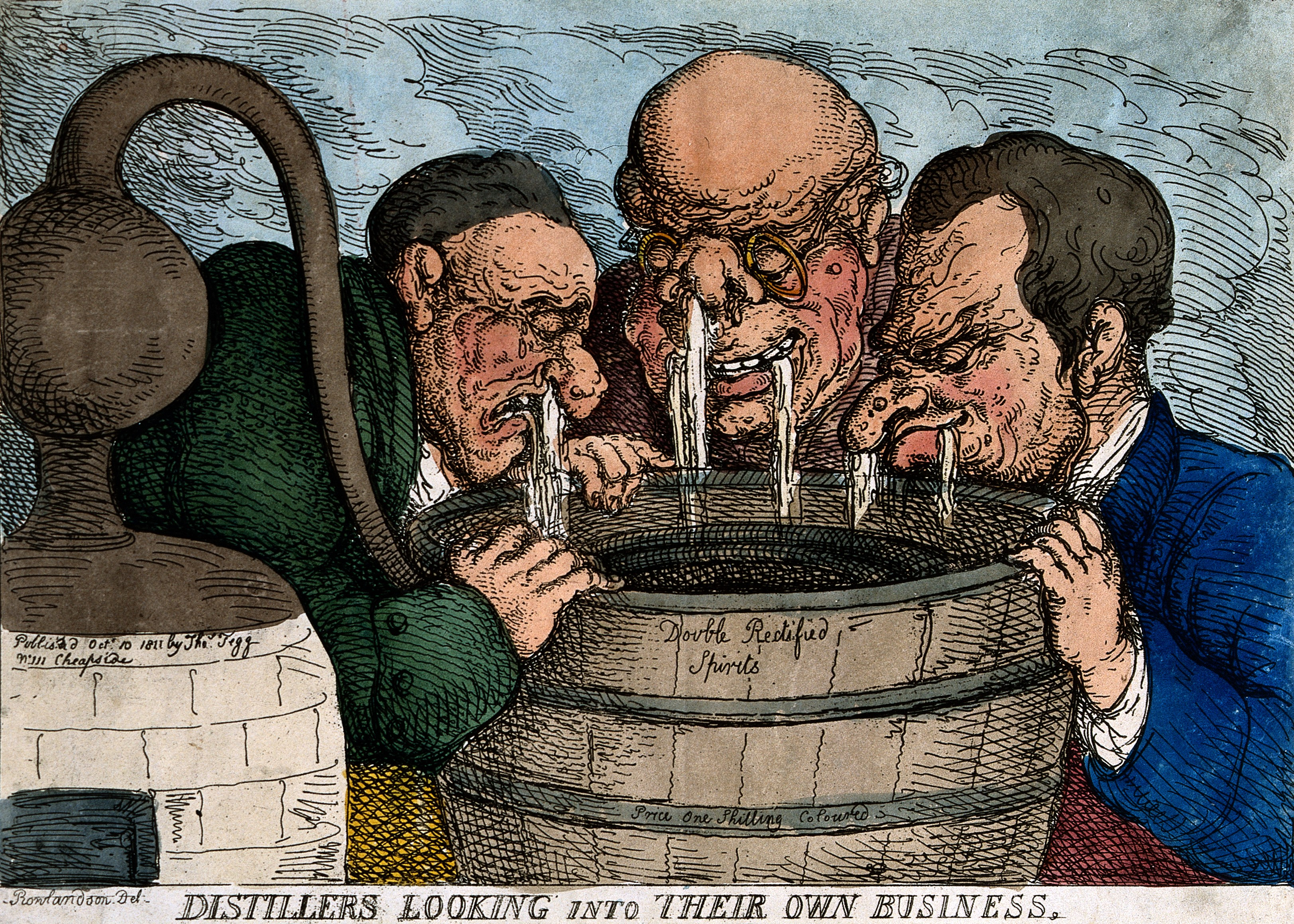
Thomas Rowlandson Distillers looking into their own Business, Caricature Magazine (Wellcome Institute, London)

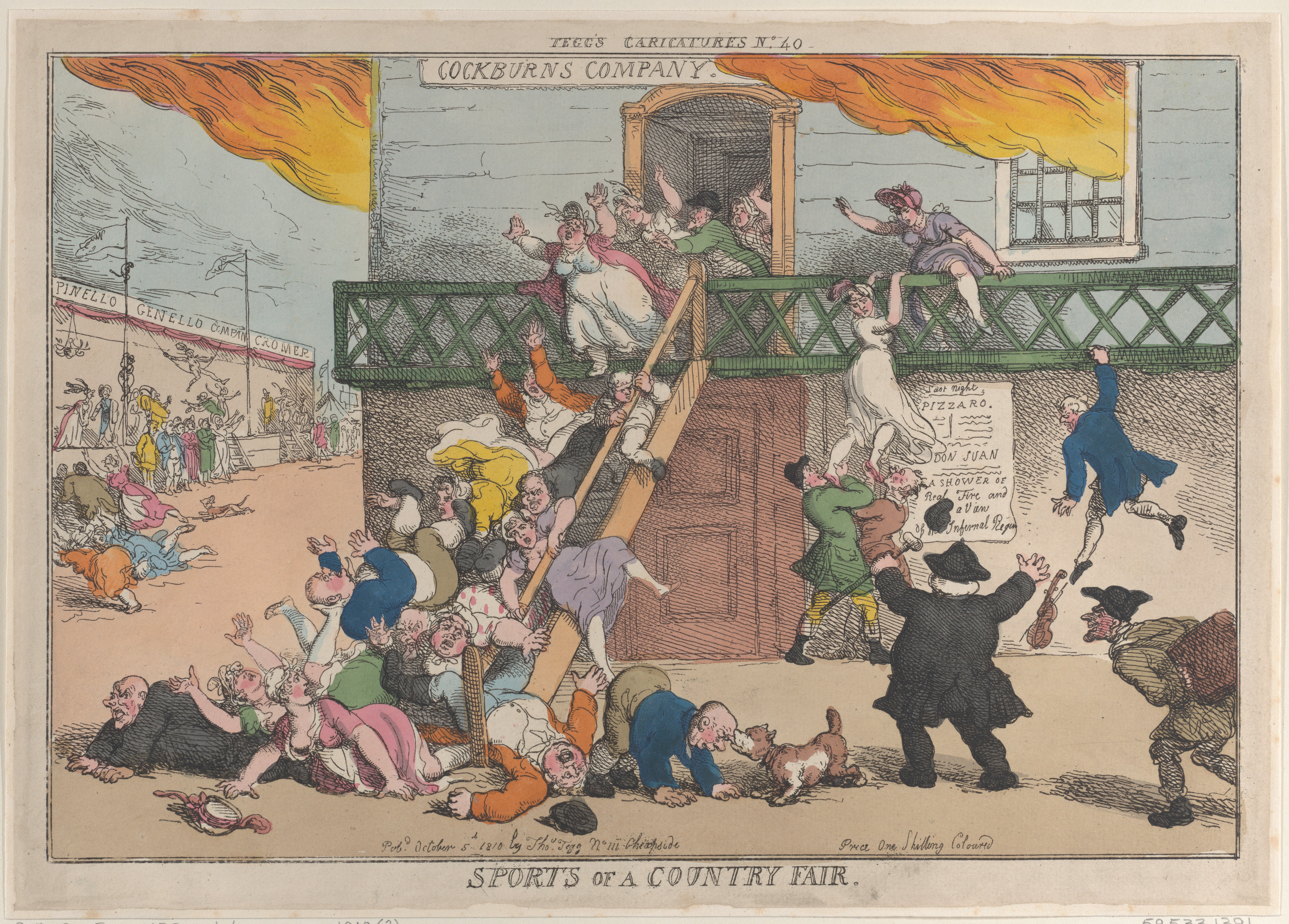
Thomas Rowlandson Sports of a Country Fair (1811), Caricature Magazine (Metropolitan Museum, New York)

Although Rowlandson is given as the leading artist on the printed wrappers for the fortnightly issue in parts, in the first instance he appears to have been merely lending his name to the project as an established 'brand'. The prints in the first few issues were mostly etched by Isaac Cruikshank after Woodward's designs. Prints by Rowlandson did not appear till April 1807. Over time Rowlandson etched well over 200 prints for the magazine including celebrated images such as Distillers Looking into their own Business (1811), Portsmouth Point (1814) and Dropsy Courting Consumption Other contributors included John Cawse, George Cruikshank, Isaac Cruikshank, Robert Cruikshank, William Elmes, Henry Heath, William Heath, Lewis Marks, Piercy Roberts, and Charles Williams

Not all of the prints issued in The Caricature Magazine were original to the magazine. Tegg bought up the caricature plates of other printsellers who had gone out of business such as Elizabeth Jackson and Piercy Roberts.

=== The bound volumes ===
At the same time as selling new issues, Tegg sold individual issues and compilations of the back numbers of the magazine that could be bound up as a volume. The publication in parts included a title page and a tailpiece every fifty or so prints precisely for this purpose. Some of the endpieces include caricature portraits of Woodward and of Tegg and possibly some of the other contributors such as Rowlandson.

Tegg used a system of numbering to index his large stock of caricature prints. These are typically etched into the top margin of the plate and are now commonly known as 'Tegg Numbers'. He changed this numbering system at least twice over time, renumbering some plates to the revised system, so that it is possible to find impressions of the same plate printed at different times with two or three different numbers, and conversely, impressions of two different plates may be found with the same number. Unlike some of Tegg's other compilations, such as The Wits Magazine and Attic Miscellany, there was no uniform edition of accumulated Caricature Magazine published once the publication in parts was completed and surviving examples of the volumes all appear to be ad hoc assemblies of a selection plates, with many minor differences between sets.

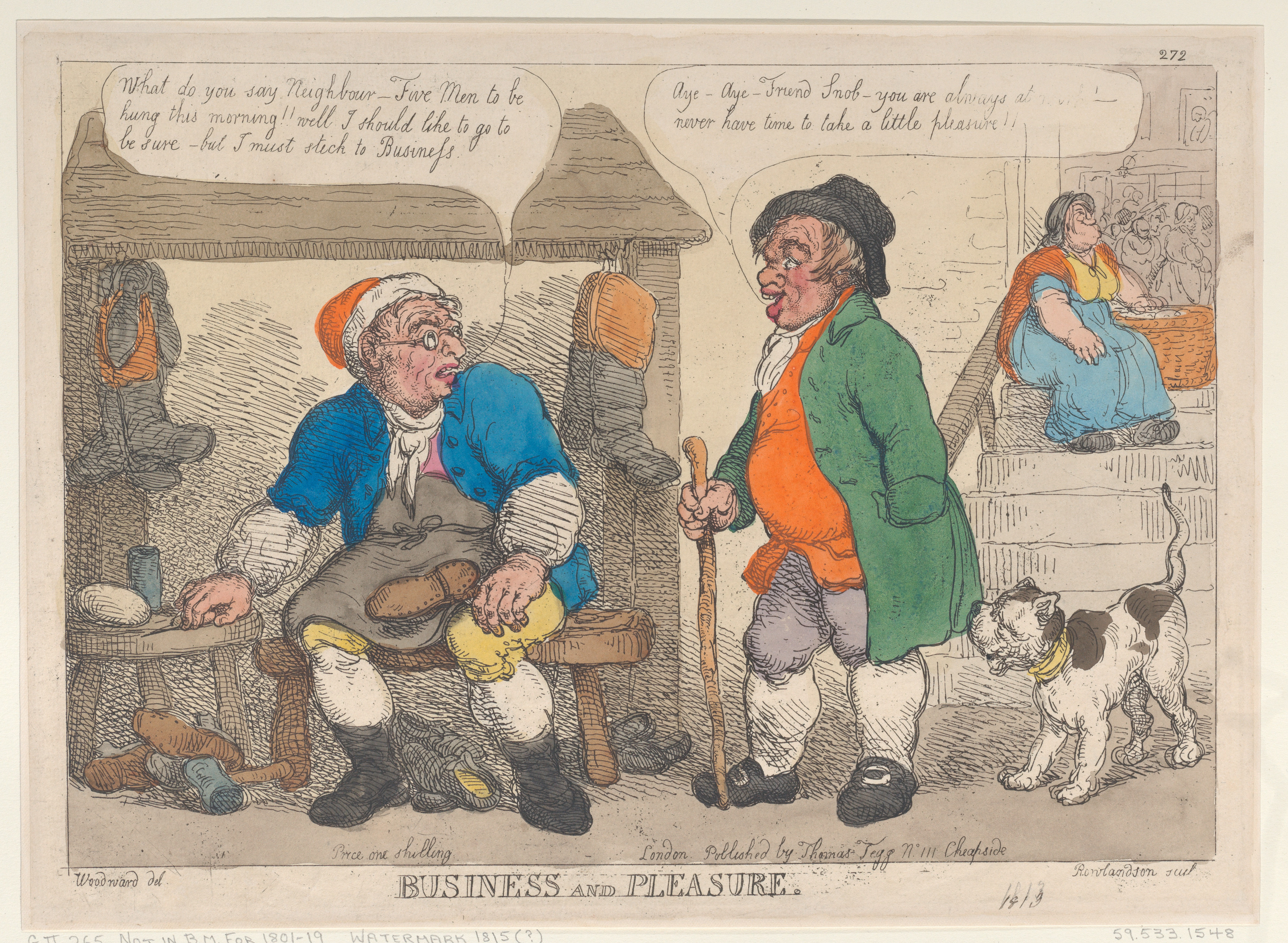
Thomas Rowlandson after G.M.Woodward. Business and Pleasure. Caricature Magazine (Metropolitan Museum, New York)

Restrikes from the Caricature Magazine plates continue to be made right up until the 1840s, often poorly printed and with slapdash colouring. Later reissues of 'Tegg' caricature plates usually have the original publication date removed from the plate, retaining just Tegg's Name and address at 111 Cheapside and of the price ("1s coloured 6d plain"). In prints satirising specific political events however, such as the rise and fall of Napoleon, the date was mostly left on.

Later on, even larger "Caricature Magazine" compilations were created for mid-19th Century collectors of caricatures, extending to as many as 5 volumes. Examples with their Tegg title pages and end pieces can be found in a number of major libraries with large caricature holdings, including Yale University Library, Lewis Walpole Library Farmington, Connecticut Princeton, Houghton Library Harvard, the Pierpont Morgan Library New York, the Art Institute of Chicago and other collections. However the large later compilations also included caricatures that were never published in the original Caricature Magazine. Among these are reduced size copies of James Gillray prints that had originally published by the London publisher Thomas Miller in the 1820s, and prints that had been independently published by Rowlandson himself - and not by Tegg - in the early 1800s.

=== Rowlandson's Caricature Magazine ===
Woodward died in 1809. Rowlandson took over as the leading name and title pages after that date bear his name rather than Woodward's (see title pages below). Rowlandson contributed nearly 200 further prints to the Magazine after Woodward's death, alongside prints by Charles Williams (caricaturist), Isaac Cruikshank and George Cruikshank.

== Subject matter ==
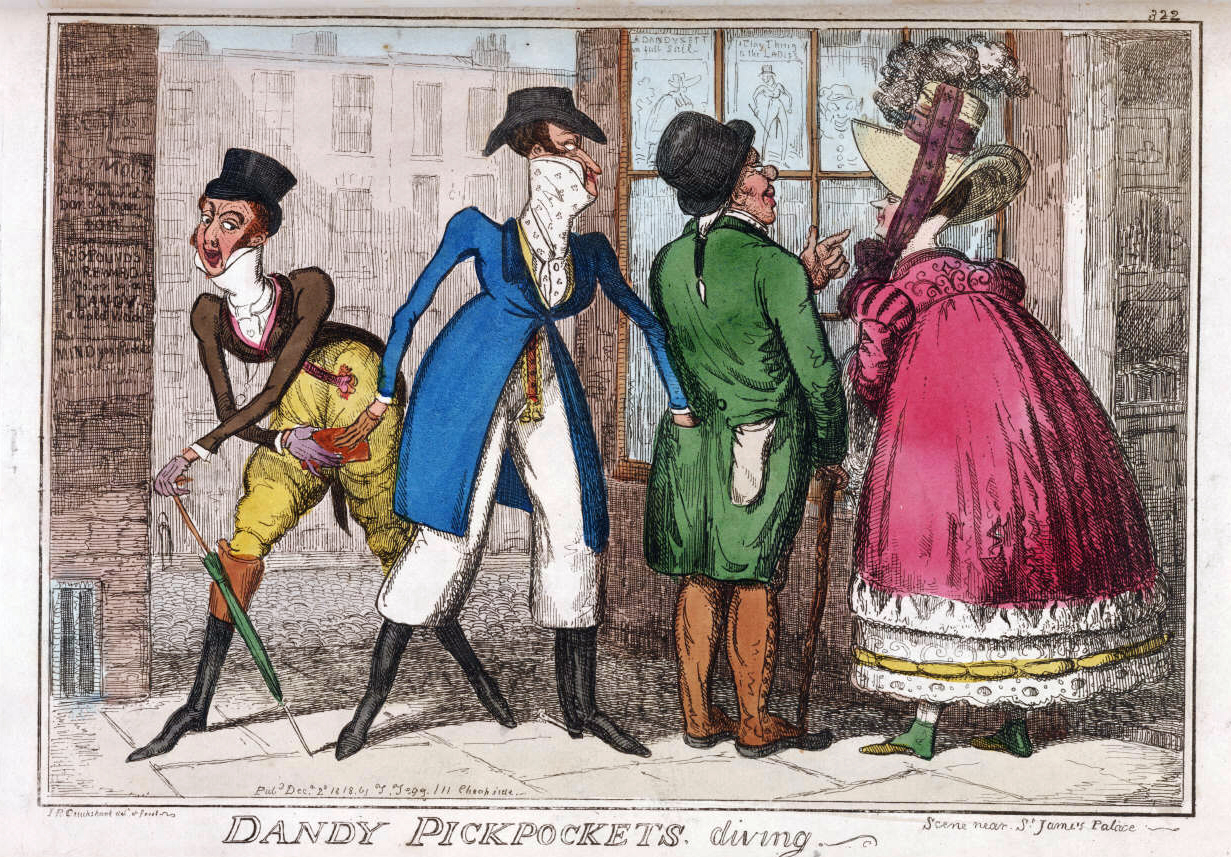
George Cruikshank Dandy pickpockets, diving 1818 Caricature Magazine

Initially the Caricature Magazine offered predominantly social caricature, but later included a limited amount of political satire, including many prints against Napoleon in the period 1807-1814 and a few on the Royal family. (Tegg's extensive series of prints on the Duke of York and the 1809 Clarke scandal were published separately by Tegg and not as part of the Caricature Magazine, although they employed a similar format and the same artists.) A comment on slavery is seen in William Elmes's two satires in comic strip form on West Indian plantation owners - The Adventures of Johnny Newcome.

The Caricature Magazine's caricatures offer a wealth of visual information and insight into daily life in the Georgian era and thus are frequently found as illustrations in modern history books for the era. They comment on a multitude of everyday subjects such as religion, divorce, doctors, barbers, servants, eating, dentistry, prostitution, sailors, taxes, etc., etc., throwing light onto on Georgian social customs and attitudes, as well as commenting on novelties in fashion such as the transgressive Dandyism, and technological innovations such as the Velocipede, forerunner of the modern bicycle.

Most of the prints from the Caricature Magazine are described in detail by M. Dorothy George in volumes VIII - to XI of the Catalogue of Political and Personal Satires Preserved in the Department of Prints and Drawings in the British Museum.

== Influence ==
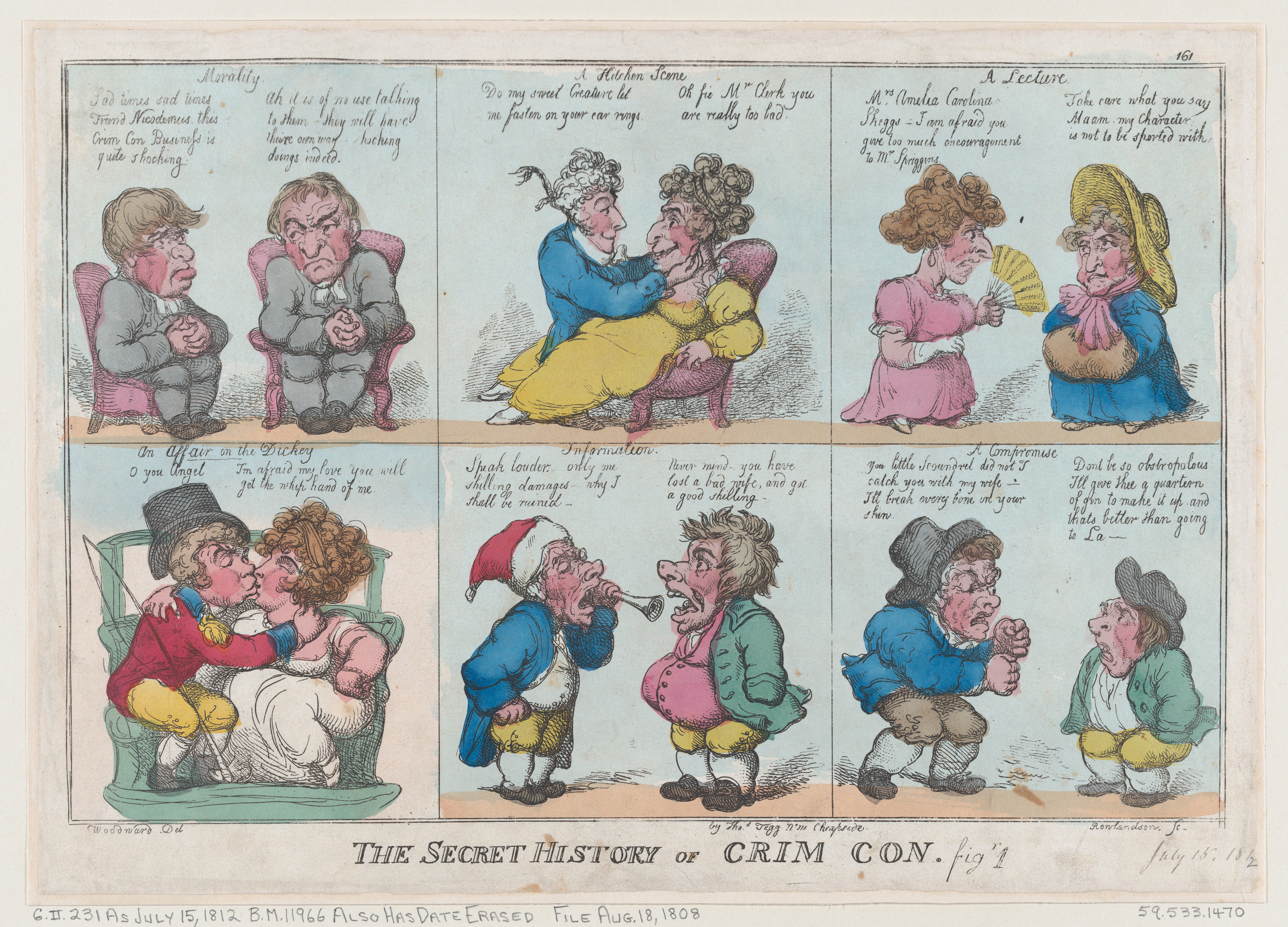
The Secret History of Crim Con, Fig 1; Thomas Rowlandson after George Woodward. Caricature Magazine (Metropolitan Museum, New York)

The Caricature Magazine's widespread popularity made it influential in developing and spreading the formulas and conventions of modern mass-market comic illustration. Woodward is recognized as one of the originators of the modern comic strip, using a sequence of related images to tell a story; a technique he first adopted in a series of strip caricatures for Samuel William Fores made in the 1790s.

He was also an early proponent of the "single gag" image, forerunner of the modern pocket cartoon, providing captions for a joke with a punchline - often extremely laboured or feeble - to accompany a comic image. Not all Woodward's images were captioned however, and some of his designs use just body language and exaggerated facial expression to express a comic situation or character.

== Gallery of Caricature Magazine title pages and end pieces ==
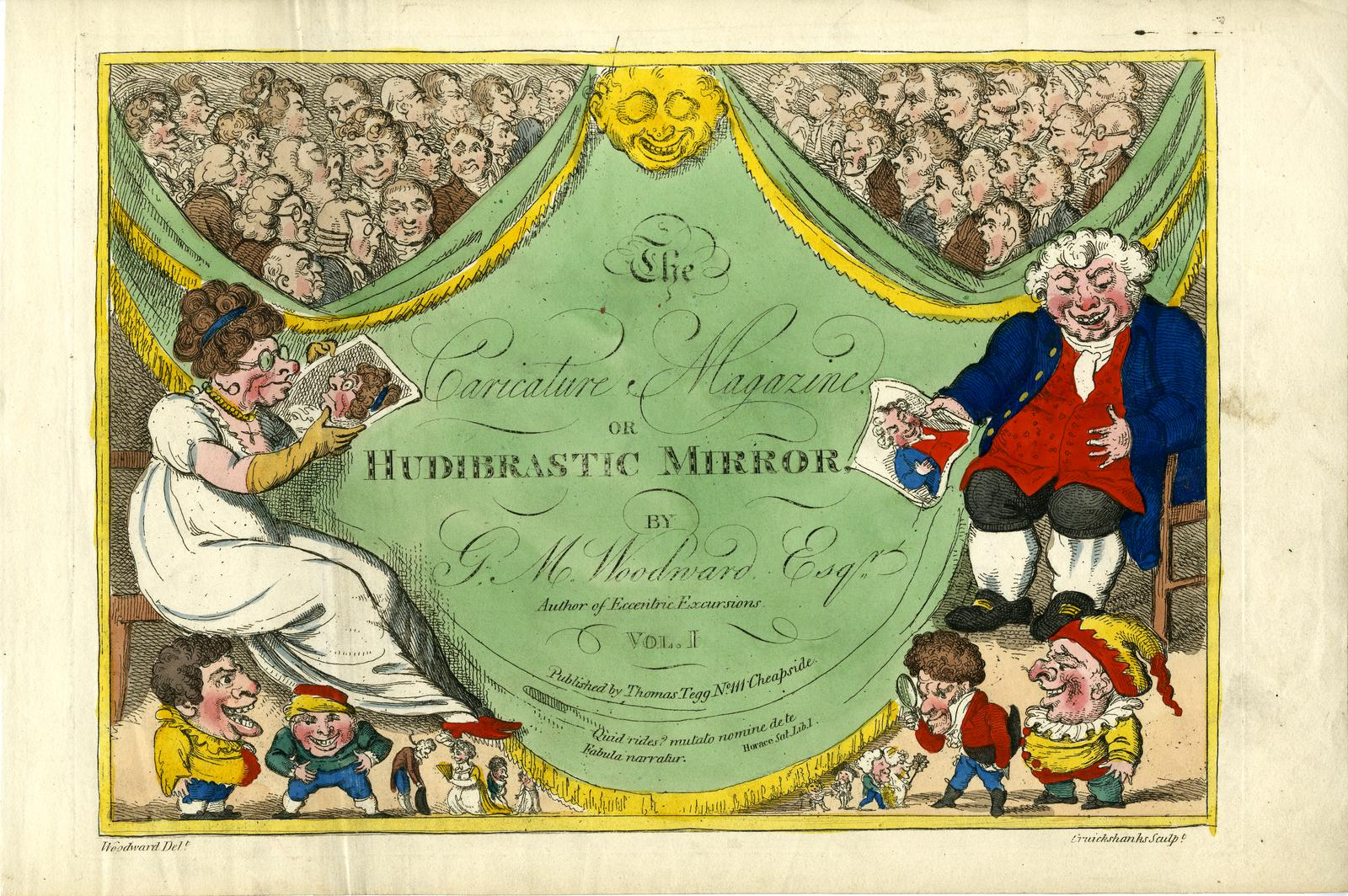
Isaac Cruikshank after George Woodward. Title page for Volume 1 of the Caricature Magazine (British Museum)

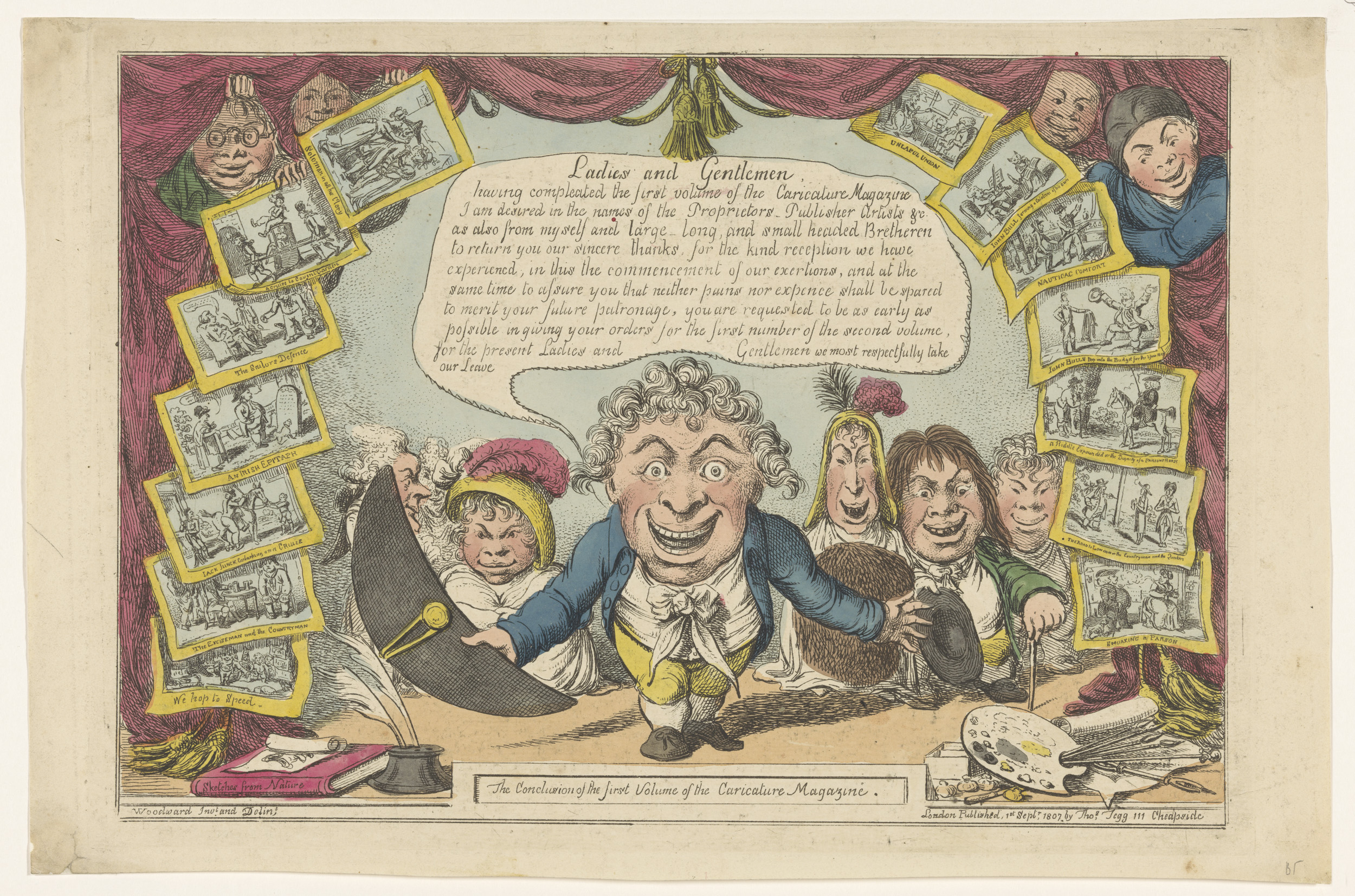
Charles Williams after George Woodward. Tail piece for Volume 1 of The Caricature Magazine; (Rijksmuseum, Amsterdam)

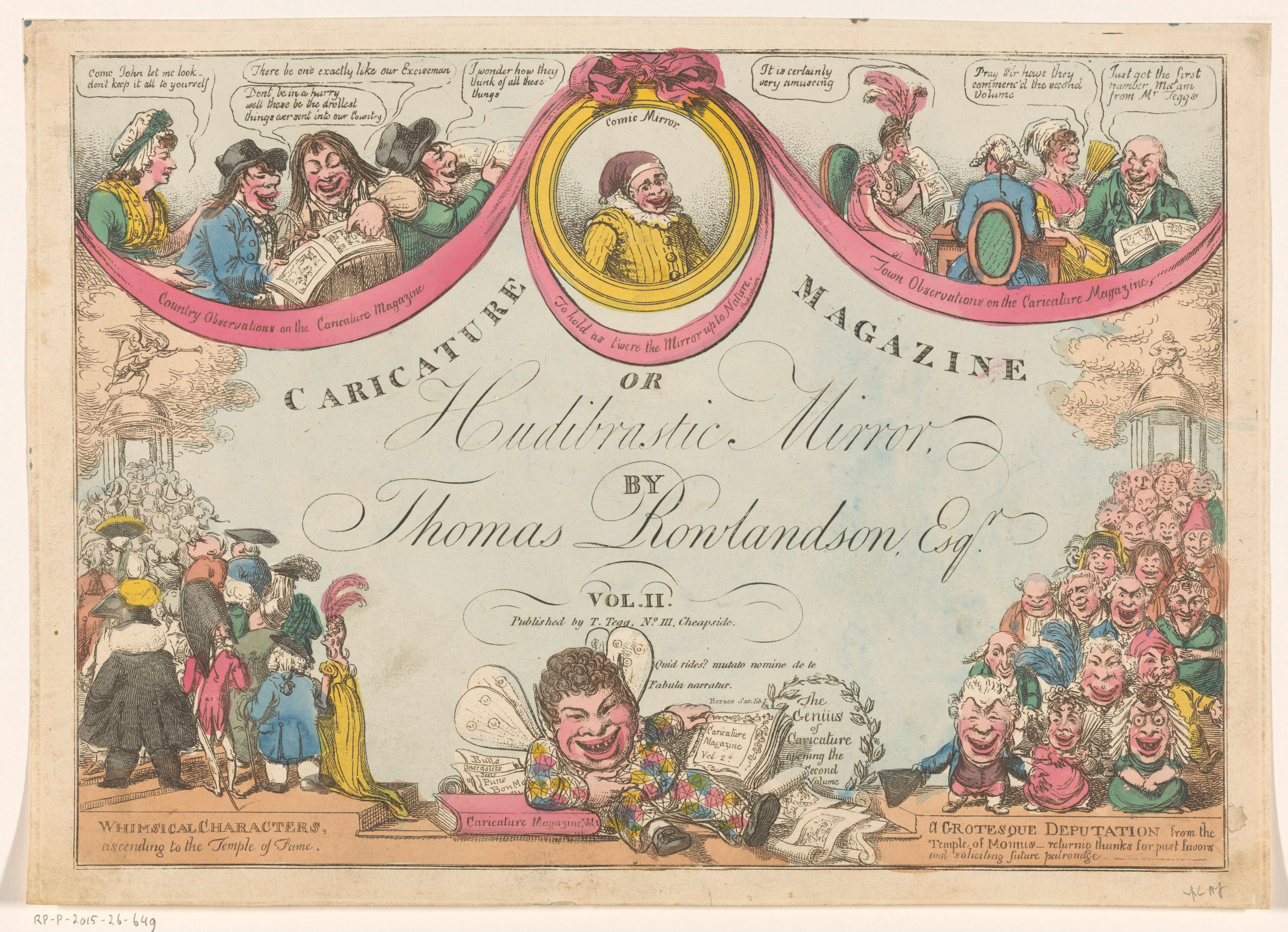
Charles Williams after George Woodward. Title page for Volume 2 of the Caricature Magazine; (Rijksmuseum, Amsterdam)

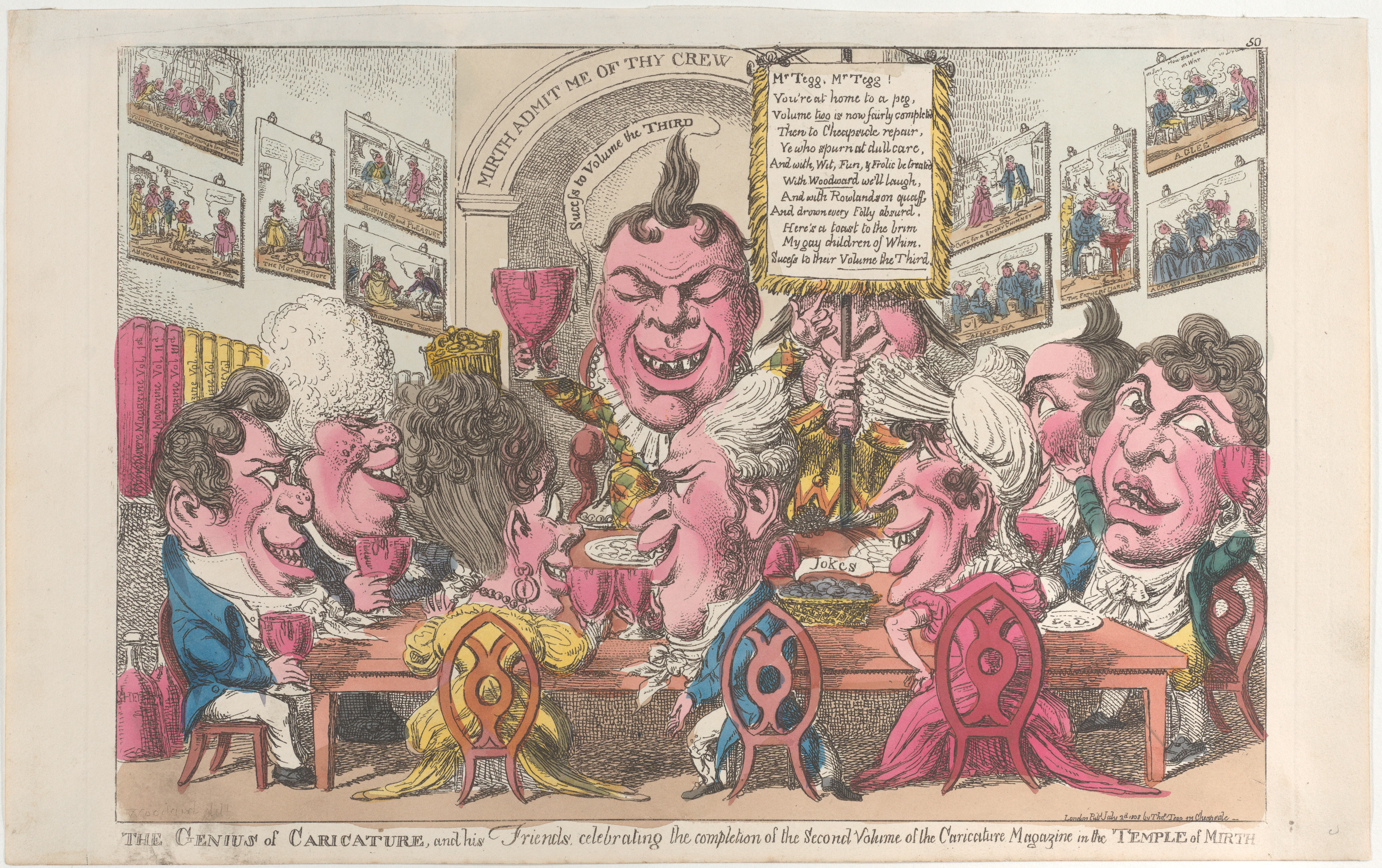
Charles WilliamsTailpiece for Volume 2 of The Caricature Magazine (Metropolitan Museum, New York)

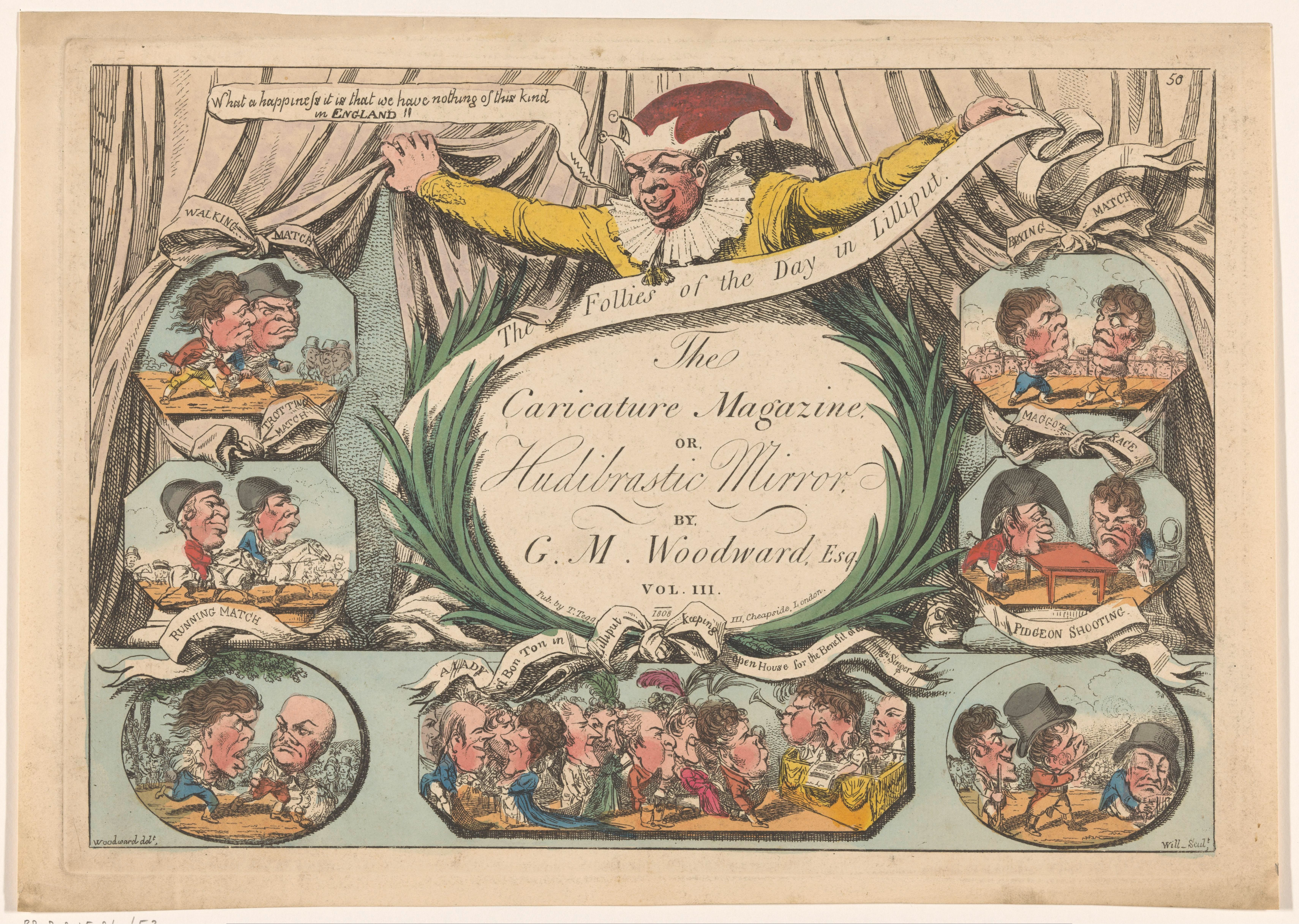
Charles Williams after George Woodward. Title page for Volume 3 of The Caricature Magazine (Rijksmuseum, Amsterdam)

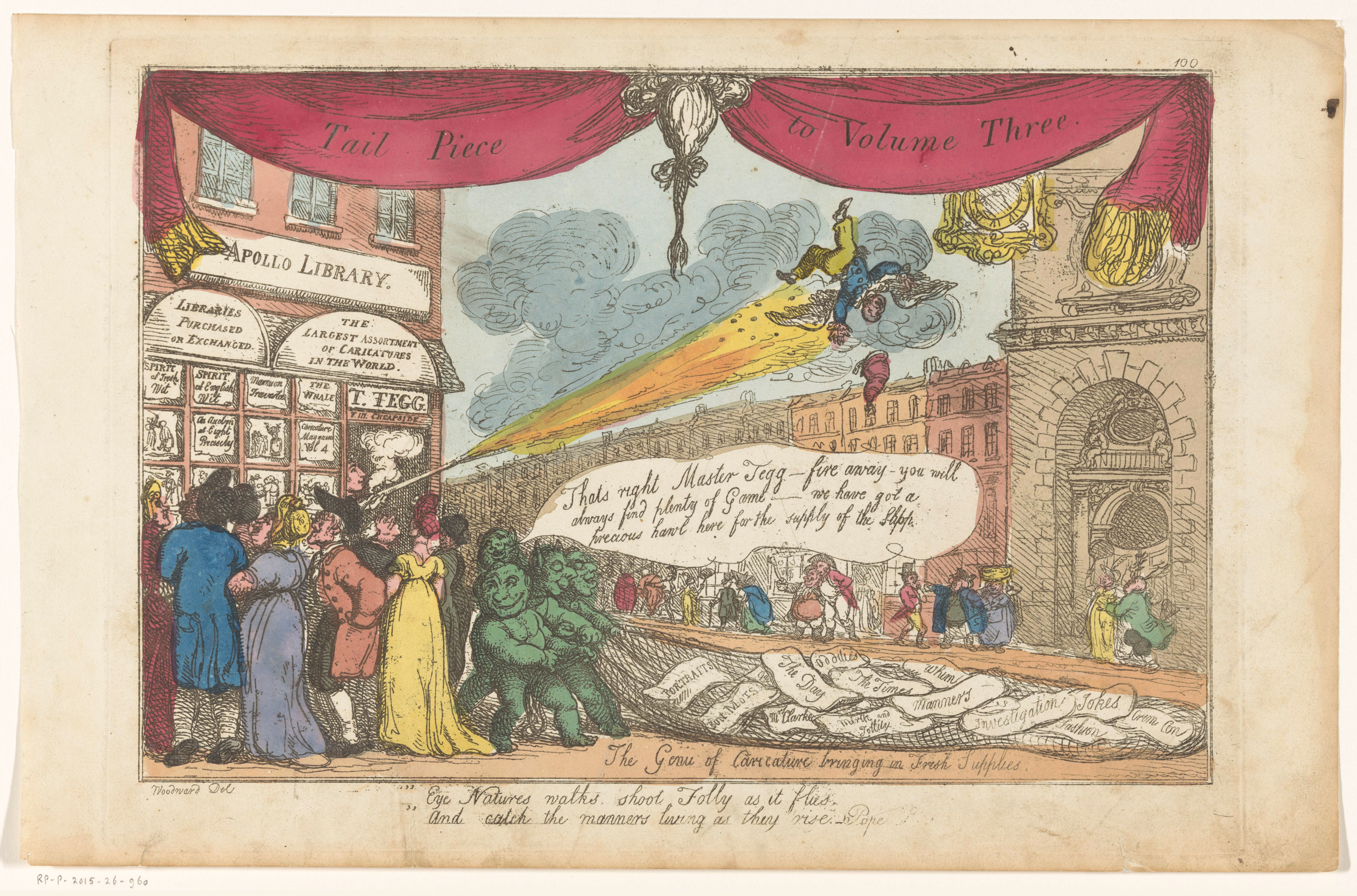
Thomas Rowlandson Tail piece for Volume 3 of The Caricature Magazine. (Rijksmuseum, Amsterdam)

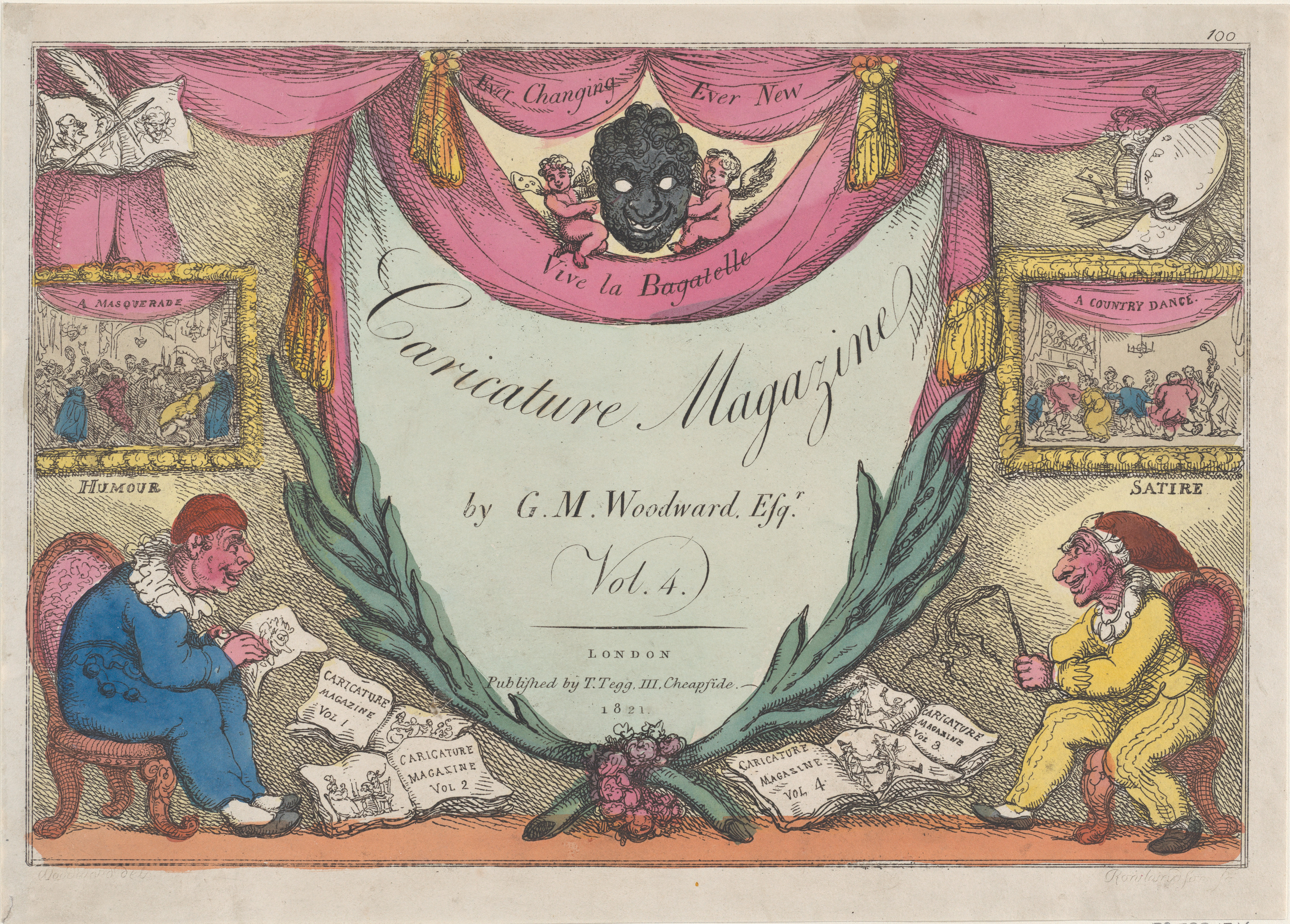
Thomas Rowlandson Title page to volume 4 of The Caricature Magazine (Metropolitan Museum, New York)

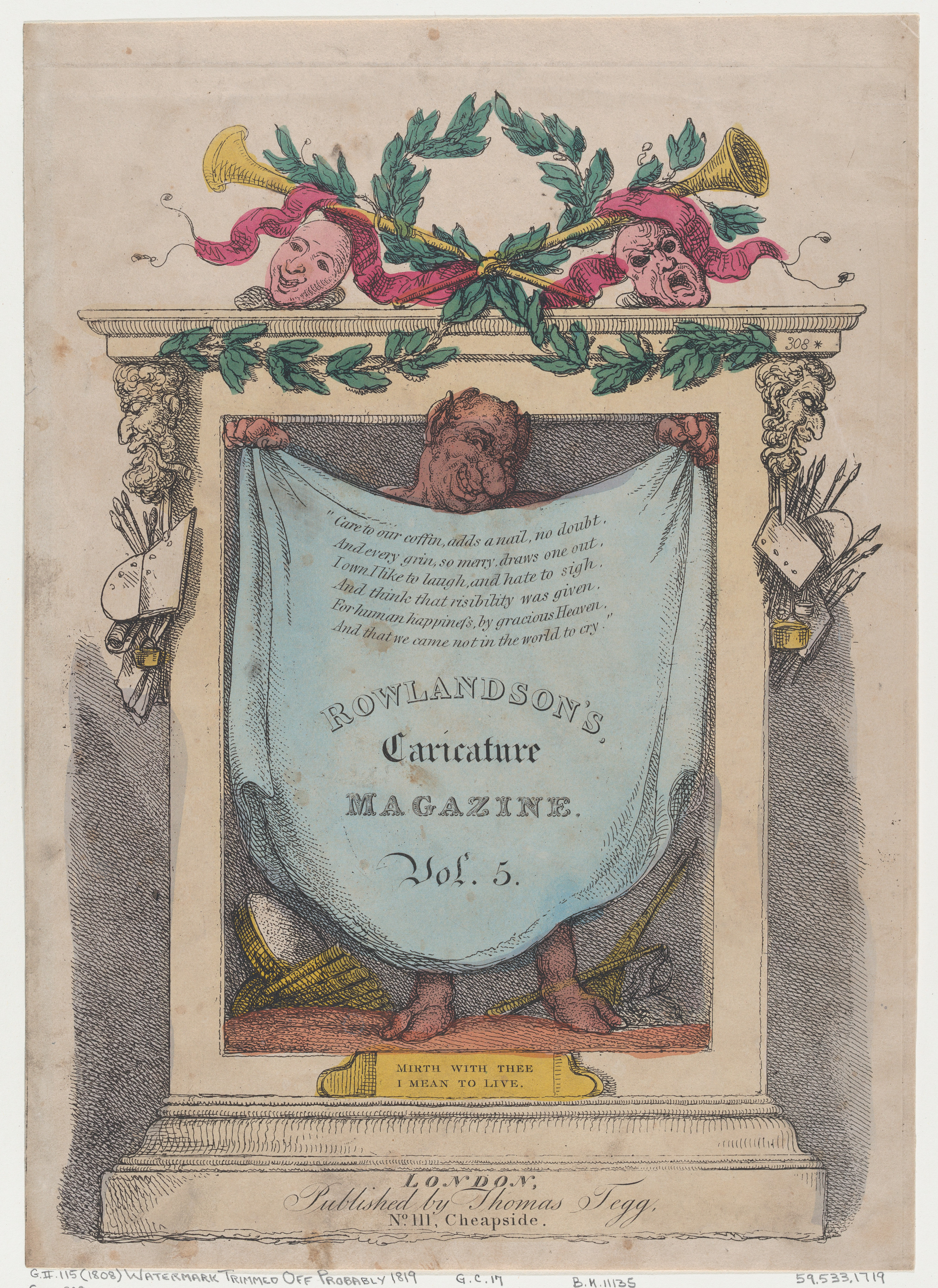
Thomas Rowlandson Title page for Volume 5 of The Caricature Magazine (Metropolitan Museum, New York)

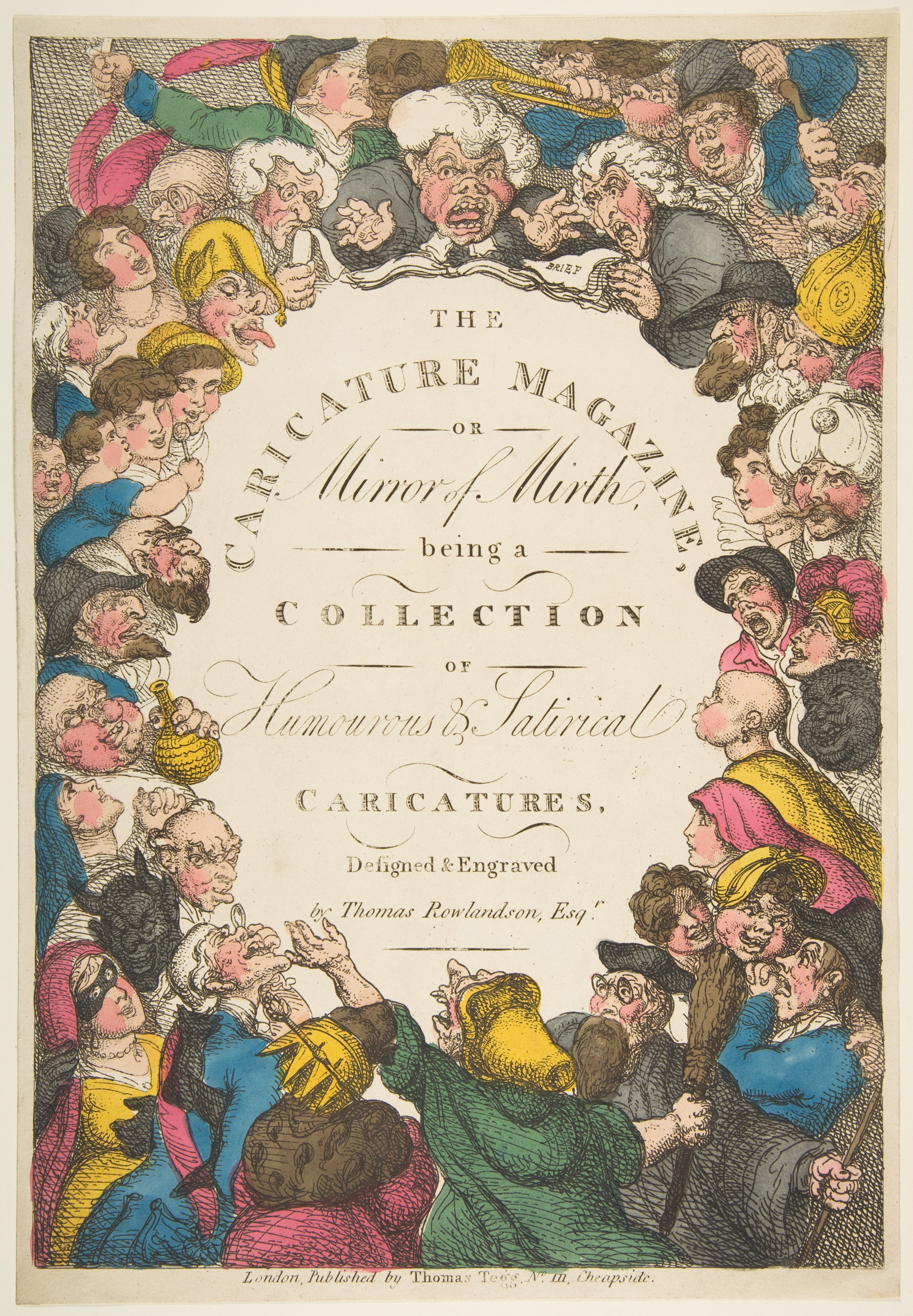
Thomas Rowlandson Title page for Rowlandson's Caricature Magazine (Metropolitan Museum, New York)

== Works cited ==
- George, M Dorothy (1870–1954). Catalogue of Political and Personal Satires Preserved in the Department of Prints and Drawings in the British Museum. The British Museum.
