= Heuristic Squelch =

American student magazine

The Heuristic Squelch is a satirical magazine published three to four times per semester by students at UC Berkeley. Founded in 1991, it is the successor to Cal’s humor tradition begun by The Pelican. The magazine distributes approximately 66,000 copies total each year in the Berkeley area as well as other parts of the state through a small subscription service. Though the paper was founded as an official ASUC-sponsored group in 1991, it lost that status in 1995 and was reformed in 1997. Only students of UC Berkeley are allowed to hold official positions in the Heuristic Squelch, but anyone is allowed to contribute material. The magazine won an award in 1999 from Rolling Stone for best college humor website.

The Heuristic Squelch is commonly associated with the SQUELCH! ASUC political party, most of whose candidates are drawn from the writers and editors of the Heuristic Squelch. During the 1995 ASUC election, the SQUELCH! party name was registered by a student not connected with the magazine. In retaliation for what they saw as candidates falsely taking credit for work on the magazine, the editors ran a special edition of the Squelch with the headline "Alex Weingarten Steals Squelch Party Name! Drowns In Own Slime!" Though the issue was printed with no ASUC funds, and though it provided no "support" for a party or candidate, it was deemed illegal campaigning and the Squelch lost all ASUC funding until 1997, when they successfully reapplied to be recognized by the ASUC. In the interim, the magazine operated solely on advertising revenues.

== See also ==
- Heuristic
