= Jon Carroll =

American journalist

- Born: November 6, 1943 (age 82); Los Angeles, California, U.S.
- Education: University of California, Berkeley
- Occupation: Columnist
- Spouses: Sandra Rosenzweig; Tracy Johnston
- Children: 2
- Awards: National Magazine Award (1979)

Jon Carroll (born November 6, 1943) is a retired newspaper columnist, best known for his work for the San Francisco Chronicle from 1982, when he succeeded columnist Charles McCabe, to 2015, when he retired. His column appeared on the back page of the Chronicle's Datebook section (the newspaper's entertainment section) Tuesdays through Fridays.

Carroll was born in Los Angeles and raised in nearby Pasadena. He attended (but did not finish) UC Berkeley, where he edited the campus humor magazine, the California Pelican. Before becoming a newspaper columnist, he worked on the editorial staff at Rolling Stone magazine (assistant editor, 1970) where he wrote "Voice Denies Nixon Drug Use," Rags magazine, Oui, a Playboy spinoff (editor, 1972); The Village Voice (West Coast editor, 1974); WomenSports magazine (Consulting editor); and New West magazine (editor, 1978, where he won a National Magazine Award in 1979). Selected newspaper columns were published in book form in Near-Life Experiences, by Chronicle Books in 1993.

== Personal life ==
He was previously married to Sandra Rosenzweig, with whom he has two daughters; daughter Shana is a trapeze artist and cofounder of the performance troup The 7 Fingers. He currently resides in Oakland, California, with his family.
