= The Georgetown Heckler =

- Editor: Mr. Heckler
- Categories: Humor
- First issue: January 13, 2003
- Country: United States
- Language: American English
- Website: georgetownheckler.com

The Georgetown Heckler is an undergraduate humor magazine founded in 2003 at Georgetown University in Washington, D.C. by Justin Droms. The satirical and comedic publication is not affiliated with the university.

== Timeline ==
In August 2007, the Heckler published a version of the school's New Student Guide intended to lampoon the New Student Organization. The Heckler later changed the design of their version, which carried many of the elements from the real version, after pressure from university administration.

In the spring of 2014, the newspaper underwent a revival during the Georgetown University Student Association election season. The Heckler's editor-in-chief Joe Luther and managing editor Connor Rohan entered the Georgetown University Student Association executive race in spring 2015. The pair won the election and assumed office in March 2015.

In the fall of 2021, The Georgetown Heckler produced a single-issue print edition that was distributed across campus. They have garnered a following on Instagram using the handle @georgetownheckler where they have over 3,000 followers.

== Notable alumni ==
Several of the original writers for the Heckler went on work for Cracked magazine, and were credited with its revival.

- Justin Droms: editor at Cracked
- Jack O'Brien: editor at Cracked
