= George Moutard Woodward =

English caricaturist and humor writer

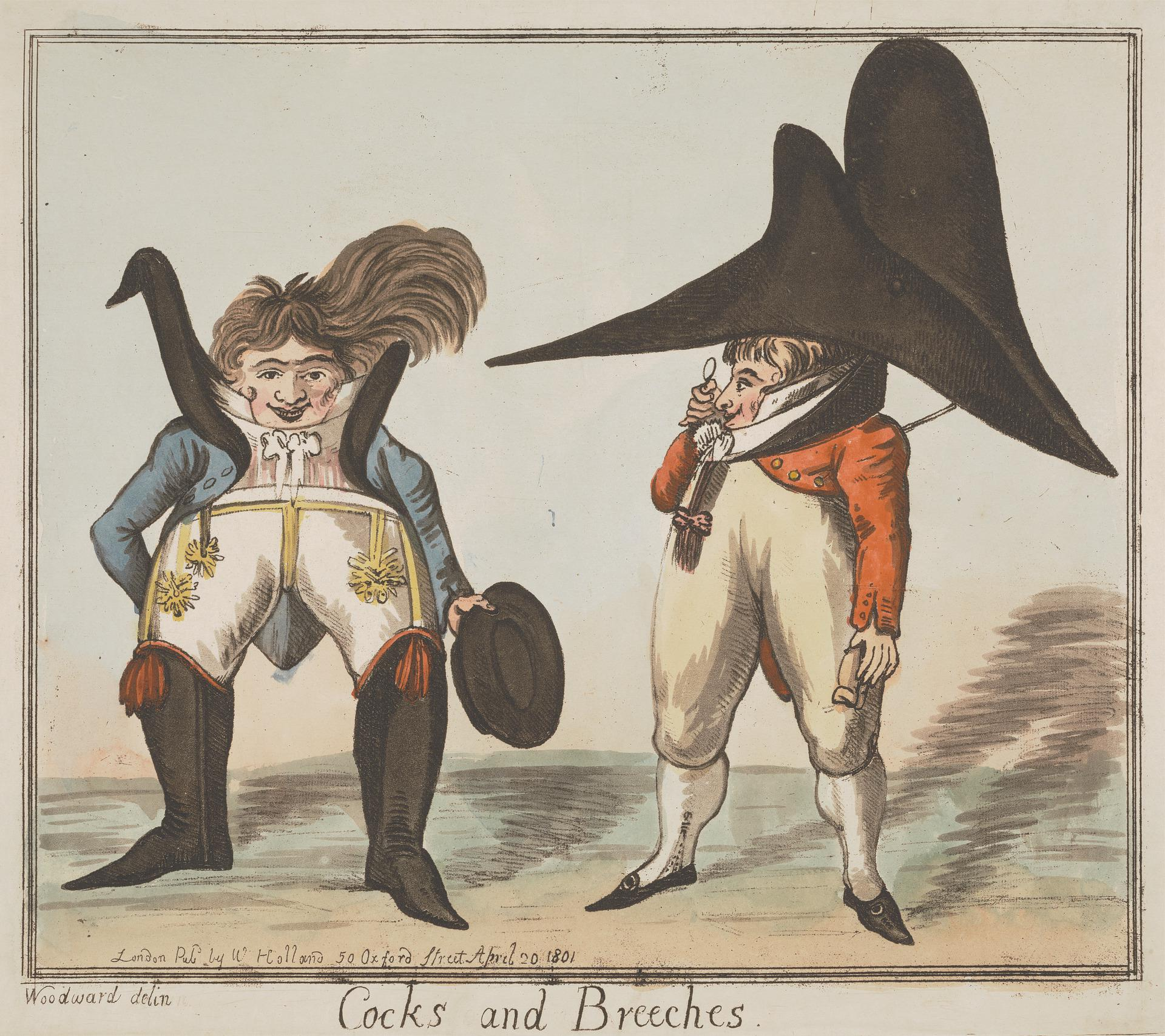
After G.M.Woodward "Cocks & Breeches" (Yale Center for British Art)

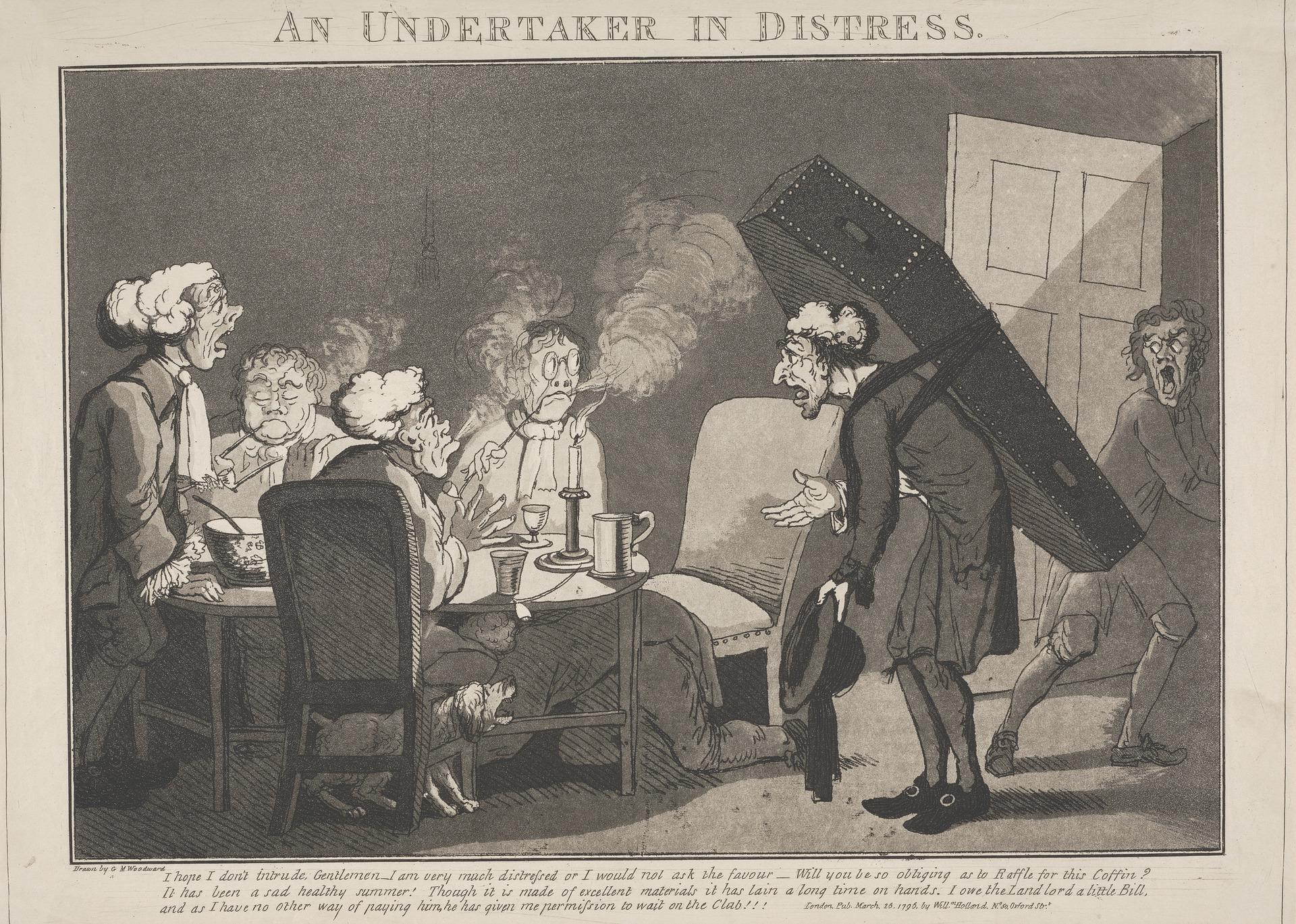
After G.M.Woodward "An Undertaker in Distress" (Yale Center for British Art)

George Murgatroyd Woodward (1765–1809), more commonly known as George 'Moutard' ("Mustard") Woodward, was an English caricaturist and humour writer. He was a friend and drinking companion of Thomas Rowlandson.

== Biography ==
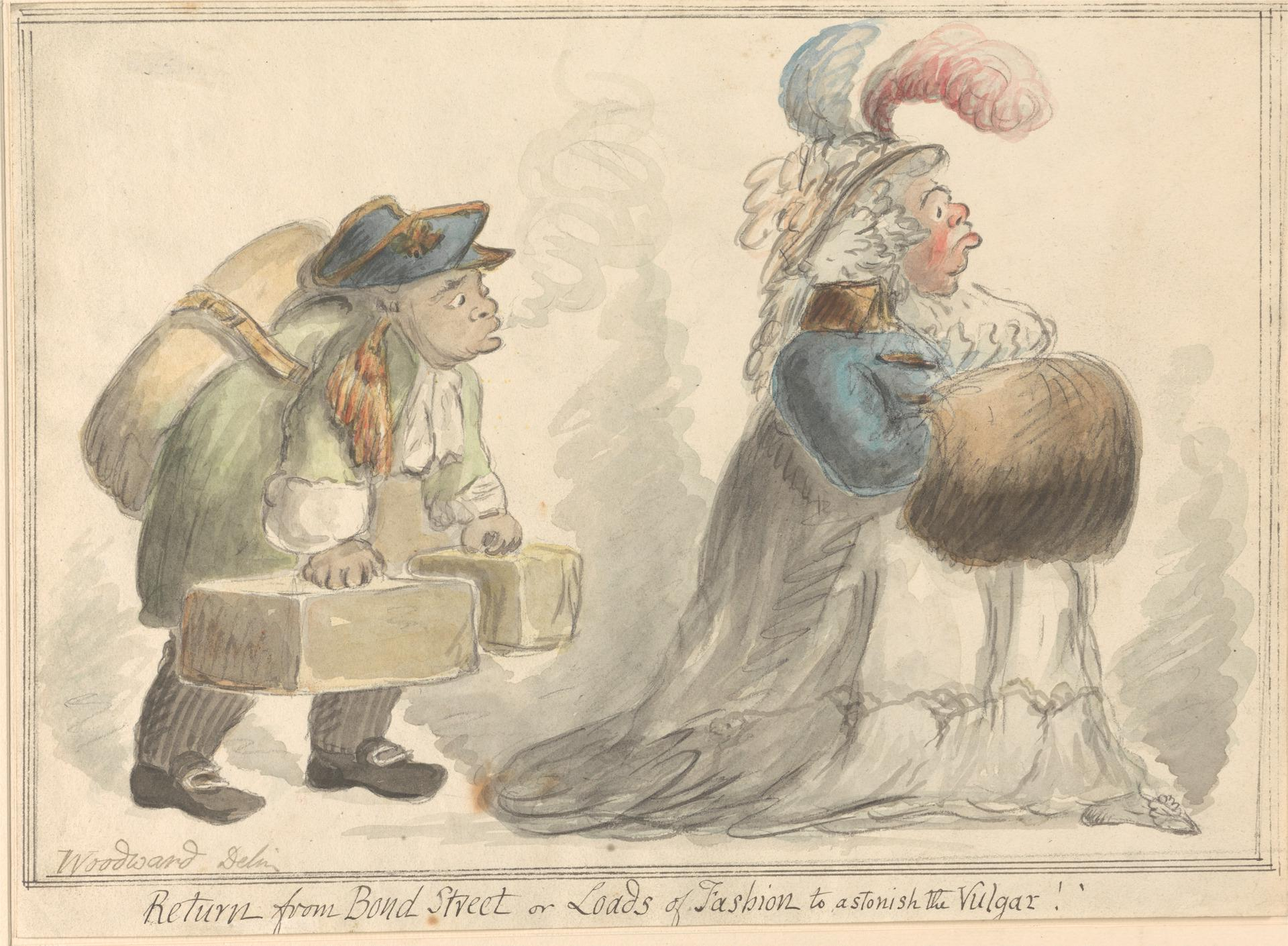
G.M.Woodward - "Return from Bond Street - or - Loads of Fashion to Astonish the Vulgar" (Yale Center for British Art)

Woodward was born in Stanton Hall, in Stanton by Dale in Derbyshire, England the son of William Woodward in 1765. Nicknamed 'Mustard George', Woodward had a somewhat crude but energetic style. Widely published in “The Caricature Magazine” and elsewhere, his drawings were nearly all etched by others, primarily Thomas Rowlandson, but also Charles Williams, Isaac Cruikshank, Piercy Roberts and others.

Dorothy George wrote of him "He makes a very considerable figure in caricature; he was original, prolific, and varied.". The George Woodward Archive in the Derbyshire Record Office in Matlock, Derbyshire has a large collection of his works. Many of his Prints are described in the Catalogue of Political and Personal Satires Preserved in the Department of Prints and Drawings in the British Museum. The most complete catalogue of his works can be found in A Catalogue of the Books, Drawings, Prints and Periodicals forming the William A. Gordon Library of British Caricature. and in its sequel Supplementary Catalogue.

== Works ==
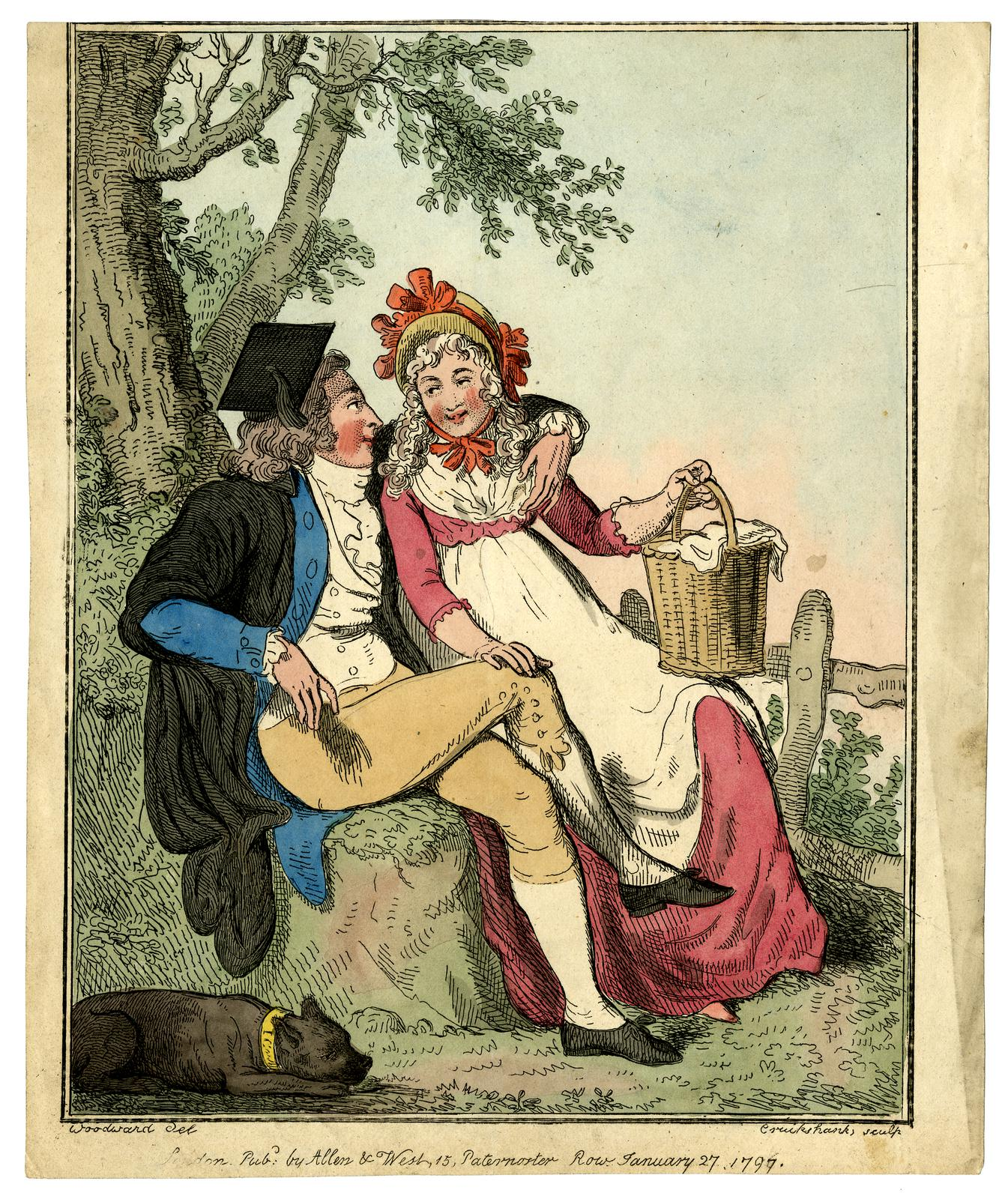
Isaac Cruickshank after G.M.Woodward "Love and learning" (British Museum)

- Eccentric Excursions in England and South Wales (1796) (sc Isaac Cruikshank)
- Cupids Magick Lantern (1797–78) (sc Thomas Rowlandson, published by Hooper & Wigstead)
- Matrimonial Comforts (1799) (sc Thomas Rowlandson)
- Country Characters (1800) (sc Thomas Rowlandson), published by Rudolph Ackermann)
- Horse accomplishments (1799) (sc Thomas Rowlandson, published by Rudolph Ackermann)
- Le Brun Travestied or Caricatures of the Passions (1800) (sc Thomas Rowlandson, published by Rudolph Ackermann)
- Grotesque Borders for Rooms and Halls (1799–1800) (sc Thomas Rowlandson, published by Rudolph Ackermann)
- Pigmy Revels (1800–1) (sc Francis Sansom, published by S. W. Fores)
- An Olio of Good Breeding (1801) (sc Isaac Cruikshank)
- The Musical Mania for the Year 1802
- Attempts at Humour (1803)
- The Bettyad (1805)
- The Caricature Magazine or Hudibrastic Mirror (1806–7) (sc Thomas Rowlandson, Isaac Cruikshank, and others, published by Thomas Tegg)
- An Essay on the Art of Ingeniously Tormenting (1808) (sc Thomas Rowlandson)
- Chesterfield Travestied, or School for Modern manners (1808) (sc Thomas Rowlandson)
- The Fugitive and Other Literary Works (1805)

== See also ==
- Rudolf Ackermann
- Thomas Rowlandson
- Thomas Tegg
