= Piercy Roberts =

English publisher, printmaker and caricaturist

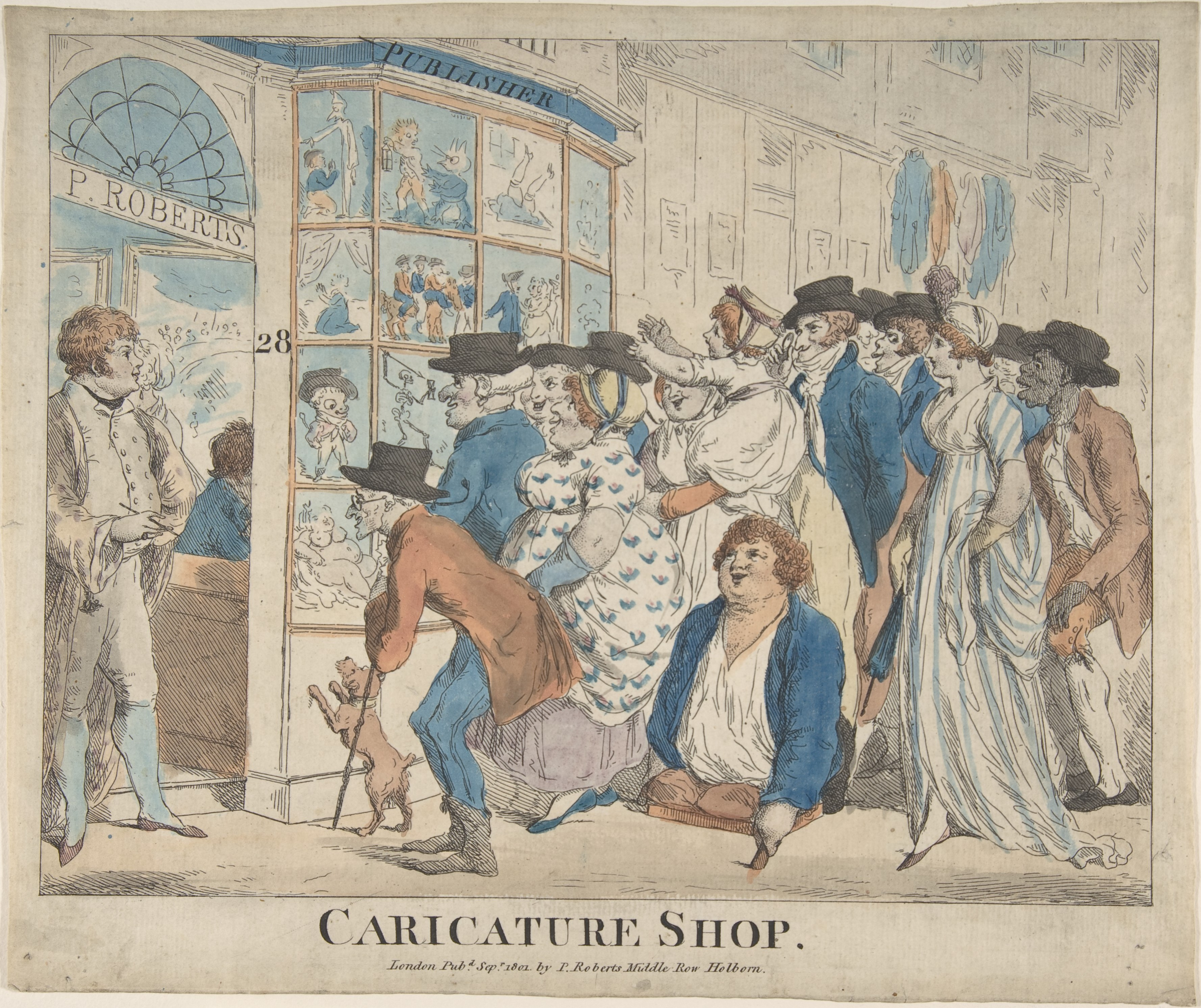
Caricature Shop of Piercy Roberts, 28 Middle Row, Holborn

Piercy Roberts was an English publisher, printmaker, and caricaturist active between 1785 and 1824. Most of his prints are caricatures, some after his own designs and some after others such as George Moutard Woodward. He collaborated with Thomas Rowlandson on several prints, most notably a pair of portraits of Josephine Beauharnais (in the Royal Collection) and Napoleon (in the British Museum).

== Life and work ==
Between 1801 and 1806, Roberts ran a print shop at 28 Middle Row Holborn and published political caricatures, as well as social caricatures. He depicts himself standing in the doorway of his print shop, with a crowd of onlookers examining his window in an 1801 print Caricature Shop, one of the best depictions of a print shop. In 1801 he acquired bankrupt stock from James Aitken but eventually himself sold up to Thomas Tegg in 1806. A number of prints originally published by Roberts prints were subsequently reissued by Tegg in the The Caricature Magazine or Hudibrastic Mirror. He made a series of anti-Napoleon prints between 1803 and 1815 and subsequently made portrait engravings for several other publishers.

His name appears among the subscribers for The Comic works in Prose and Poetry of G.M.Woodward a memorial collection for Woodward published by Thomas Tegg in 1808.
