= California Pelican =

American college humor magazine

The California Pelican was a college humor magazine founded in 1903 by Earle C. Anthony at the University of California, Berkeley. Lasting eighty years, it was the first successful student humor magazine in UC Berkeley, though it was preceded by Smiles in 1891 and Josh in 1895. It is succeeded by the Heuristic Squelch, which is still running.

== Description ==
Gender was significant in the magazine's name. Although early issues carried an illustration of the eponymous bird on its cover, at the turn of the twentieth century “pelican” was actually an uncomplimentary term for female Berkeley students. The publication was even often referred to as “the Old Girl,” in contrast to its cross-bay counterpart, the Stanford Chaparral, known as “the Old Boy.”

Often referred to simply as the Pelican, the magazine featured cartoons, poetry, original humor articles, and short jokes reprinted from other college humor magazines such as the Pennsylvania Punchbowl and Dartmouth Jack-O-Lantern. Aside from its wealthy founder, the magazine's most well known contributor was Rube Goldberg, who drew cartoons for the magazine as a student. Goldberg recalled in later years that he “had great admiration for Earle Anthony, the editor of the Pelican, a tall, gangling young man who wore his floppy senior stovepipe at a jaunty angle and took long strides across the campus like one who had the past, present and future all wrapped in a nice secure package. When he accepted one of my drawings it gave me a greater thrill than a good mark in calculus or geology.” Additionally, science fiction author Ron Goulart wrote for the magazine and later republished one of his Pelican articles professionally.

== History ==
According to Verne Stadtman's Centennial Record, the magazine was founded on April 16, 1903 by Anthony and an original staff of ten. It eventually became sponsored by the Associated Students and by the 1960s was issued once a month during each school year. The Centennial Record lists its circulation as 7,000 copies per issue in 1965, making it the second largest publication on the campus at that time. The Daily Cal newspaper, published each day, had the largest circulation.

The magazine was given the rare privilege of its own building on the UC Berkeley campus in 1957 after Earle C. Anthony donated money to the university to provide a home for the publication he had created. Although the structure beside Strawberry Creek is now occupied by the Graduate Student Assembly, the prominence of pelicans in architect Joseph Esherick's design as well as Irene Rich's larger-than-life pelican sculpture on the front lawn leave no doubt as to Anthony Hall's original purpose. Still exhibiting the sense of humor that had led to the magazine's founding more than a half-century before, Anthony fittingly arranged for a live pelican at the dedicatory ceremonies over which Berkeley Chancellor Clark Kerr presided.

The 1960s were especially difficult times for the Pelican and marked the beginning of a long period of turmoil and changes of directions in the publication's history. As the Free Speech Movement flourished at Berkeley in the mid-decade and students’ minds turned to more serious matters, there seemed little place for a humor magazine. After struggling for several years, the Old Girl finally succumbed, the October 1970 number being the last in the traditional humorous format.

By the spring of that college year, The New California Pelican emerged, adopting a feature or variety format that did not, however, necessarily exclude humor. The opening editorial explained, “The old PELICAN has waddled on unsteady legs since around 1963, and this fall, the last editors quietly packed up their negatives of Miss Pelly Girls and left. This issue of the NEW CALIFORNIA PELICAN was put out on short notice by some graduates in the School of Journalism. We had a few suitable pieces from classes; we wrote a few new things, got some art, took some pictures... The point was to keep the bird alive. There has been no continuity between the old PELLY staff and the new.” With the request to “think of us as a magazine-in-progress,” a second issue was produced in May 1971 that included a humorous story, “Kansas.” Three quarterly numbers issued during the 1971-1972 academic year under the title California Pelican.

An abortive attempt to restore Pelican to its humorous past opened the 1972-1973 academic year. While several members of the editorial board were involved in a voter registration campaign in the south, Business Manager Robert Laubach produced an issue composed of work from the late 1960s, including several cartoons by Joel Beck. Laubach, styling himself as the managing editor, announced that “the Pelican has changed again. Rather than remaining the straight magazine of last year, I have decided to resurrect the old idea of being funny.” He called for all interested persons who shared his vision to come to an organizational meeting at Pelican Building on November 9, 1972.

By the time of the meeting, however, Editor-in-Chief Francis Moriarty was back and firmly in control. The three students who appeared in response to Laubach's call were disappointed. Although Monroe McBride took the business manager's post with the Pelican, Cutler Durkee, Don Goff, and he resolved to launch their own humor magazine, The Berkeleyan, which published its inaugural issue in the fall of 1974. Pelican produced a single number in 1972-1973, that in a quarterfold format distributed on campus at no charge.

Citing several years of unsustainable red ink, the Associated Students of the University of California (ASUC) acted in May 1973 to cease funding not only Pelican but also the yearbook, Blue and Gold, and the venerable literary magazine, Occident. Seeing that the ASUC was willing to fund new publications (The Berkeleyan had received funding in the next year's budget), the editors of the three defunded publications proposed a merger, the new journal to feature the principal elements of its predecessors. The ASUC accepted this alternative at the expense of The Berkeleyan, which declined to participate in the merger.

Rescued from extinction, the joint publication never issued, while Occident found another source of funds and withdrew from the arrangement.

Under the driving leadership of Professors Josephine Miles and Leonard Michaels, English, and Bernard Taper, Journalism, a new ASUC publications committee took a firm hand and, among other things, restored Pelican’s funding as a feature magazine. Issues appeared on a regular, quarterly basis starting in the fall of 1974. Although the staff still met, planned, and worked, it did not produce another number after the fall of 1975. Pelican became dormant again in June 1976.

== Revival ==
One last revival remained. Early in 1978, undergraduate Kevin Sweeney and similarly minded companions formulated plans to bring back Pelican as a humor magazine. On May 24, 1978, they met in Bowles Hall with Sweeney’s now-graduated Kappa Delta Rho fraternity brother, Monroe McBride ‘76. The Berkeleyan had also become dormant after a financially successful 1975-1976 school year, leaving substantial funds in its trust account with the ASUC. McBride arranged for Sweeney to meet with the few remaining members of The Berkeleyan’s editorial board and merge the magazines, giving Pelican a more financially sound start than it would have had otherwise. Under the title The Berkeleyan and California Pelican and published by The Berkeleyan Association/California Pelican, the journal reappeared in the fall of 1978 (volume 85:1), shortening its name to The California Pelican starting in the 1979-1980 academic year.

The Pelican lasted until 1988, the last volume found in Bancroft Library, when the Old Girl apparently "sputtered and died." With its demise the only copies of the Pelican readily accessible can be found in Bancroft Library at the University of California, Berkeley and the Southern Regional Library Facility at UCLA. An art book entitled Sweetness and Light has also been published, containing the best art featured in the Pelican from its founding until 1943, as well as photographs of the University of California from 1868 to 1943. Copies of the magazine appear frequently on eBay with most of them in very good condition. A magazine titled "The Pelican" with a subtitle "Magic, Myth and Religion" was purchased on eBay and states that it is Volume 81 Number 2. This magazine states that the editorial and business offices were in the Pelican building on the UC Berkeley Campus. The volume number/year scheme is consistent with the volume number scheme throughout the entire California Pelican publication run.

== Contributors ==
Notable contributors include Frank Chin and Jon Carroll.
