= The Comic News =

- Type: Monthly newspaper
- Format: Tabloid
- Founder: Thom Zajac
- Editor: Thom Zajac, John Govsky
- Founded: 1984
- Headquarters: Santa Cruz, California
- Website: thecomicnews.com

The Comic News is a monthly American newspaper based in Santa Cruz, California.

== History ==
Thom Zajac, the founder of the newspaper was inspired by editorial cartoons he read and discovered cartoons made by Pulitzer Prize-winning cartoonists were cheap to print. The first issue for the newspaper was published in September 12, 1984.

Popularity surged in the 1980s after the newspaper got the rights to publish Calvin and Hobbes and The Far Side.

In 2004, co-editor and co-publisher John Govsky digitized the newspaper to publish daily and weekly updates, as opposed to the past monthly print edition of the newspaper.

In 2009, Zajac scaled down his business and runs the current newspaper from his home in Bonny Doon. During this time, circulation went from 12,000 to 4000+. The newspaper also celebrated its 25th anniversary.

In 2024, The Comic News celebrated its 40th anniversary.

== Influence ==
Nina Paley, writer of Nina's Adventures and Fluff, got her start from the newspaper in the late 1980s.
