= Rowlandson =

Rowlandson is an English surname meaning son of Rowland or Roland.

Bearers of the name include:

- Alfred Cecil Rowlandson (1865–1922), Australian publisher
- James Rowlandson (1577–1639), English Canon of Windsor
- Mary Rowlandson (c. 1637–1711), colonial American woman, captured by Native Americans, who described her experiences
- Thomas Rowlandson (1757–1827), English artist and caricaturist
