= William Elmes =

English caricaturist

William Elmes (active 1811–20 ), was an English caricaturist.

There are over 45 caricatures by him, many on naval subjects, as well as two satires on slavery, in the Catalogue of Political and Personal Satires Preserved in the Department of Prints and Drawings in the British Museum, which describes his work as "genuine caricature, broadly burlesqued, naively drawn". His work includes caricatures after prints by James Gillray and Thomas Rowlandson.
