= Charles Williams (caricaturist) =

British caricaturist, etcher and illustrator

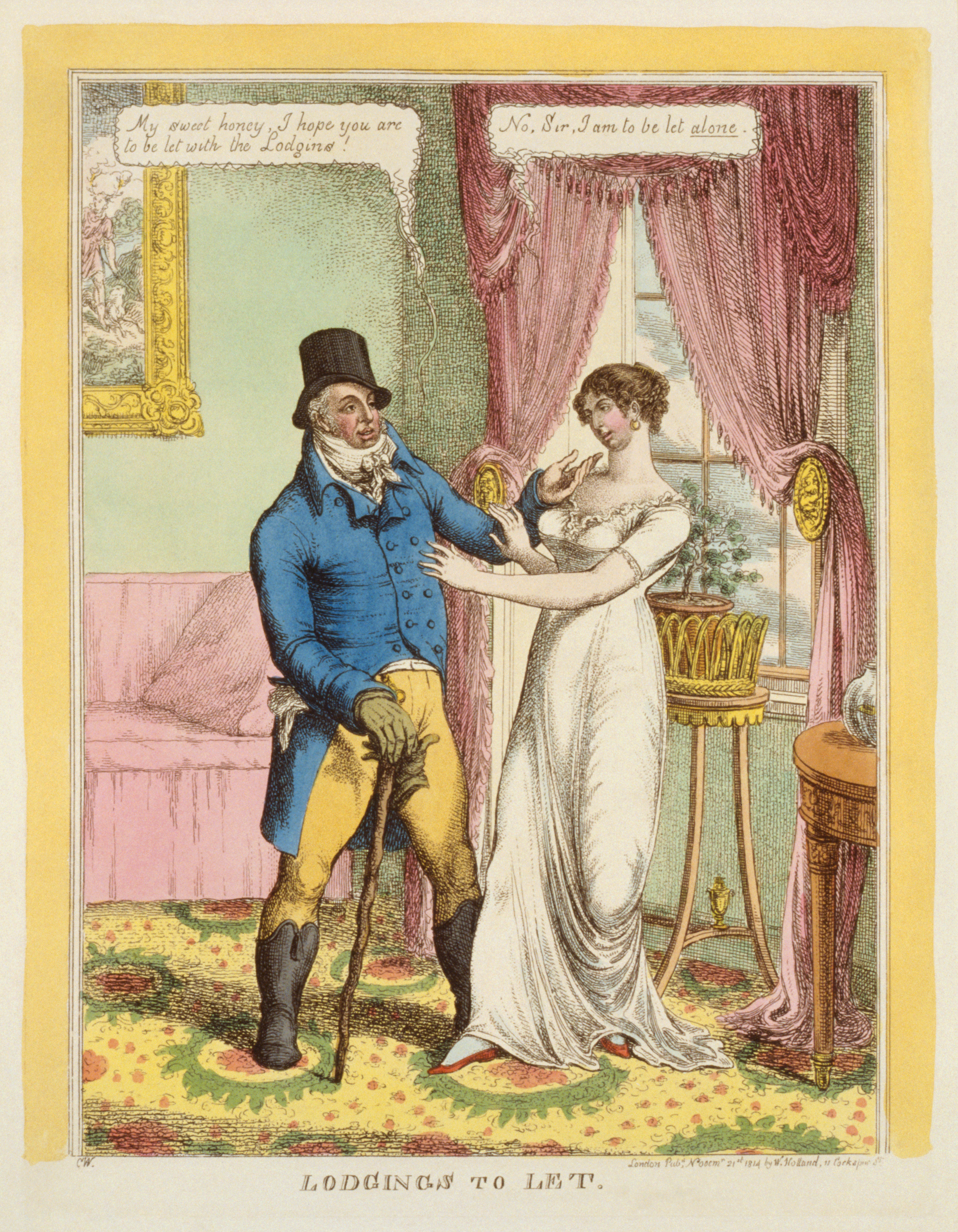
An 1814 engraving by Charles Williams.

Charles Williams (died 1830) was a British caricaturist, etcher and illustrator. He was chief caricaturist between 1799 and 1815 for the leading British publisher S. W. Fores. He worked in a style similar to James Gillray's. A number of his prints are, in fact, exact or near-exact copies of Gillray's such as the caricature 'More pigs than teats, or the new litter of hungry grunters, sucking John Bulls old sow to death' which also contains a criticism of Gillray in the lower margin. In his earlier works, Williams used the pseudonyms Ansell or Argus; with George Cruikshank and others he illustrated The Every-Day Book by William Hone, edited 1825–26.

Williams was the first of many who caricatured the 1st Duke of Wellington; he published a drawing of him in September 1808, during the Peninsular War, in which the Duke cuts off the pigtail of French general Jean-Andoche Junot, defeated at the Battle of Vimeiro.

== Works ==
- J. Mitford The Adventures of Johnny Newcome in the Navy (1819)
- W. Combe Doctor Syntax in Paris, or, a Tour in Search of the Grotesque (1820)
- The Tour of Doctor Prosody: in Search of the Antique and Picturesque (1821)
- My Cousin in the Army, or, Johnny Newcome on the Peace Establishment (1822)

== Sources ==
- Catalogue of Political and Personal Satires Preserved in the Department of Prints and Drawings in the British Museum, Mary Dorothy George. Vol VI 1938, Vol VII, 1942 VOL VIII 1947, VOL IX 1949
- Dictionary of British Cartoonists and caricaturists 1730-1980 Bryant and Heneage, Scolar Press 1994
