= Julius Soubise =

Saint-Kittian-born socialite (1754–1798)

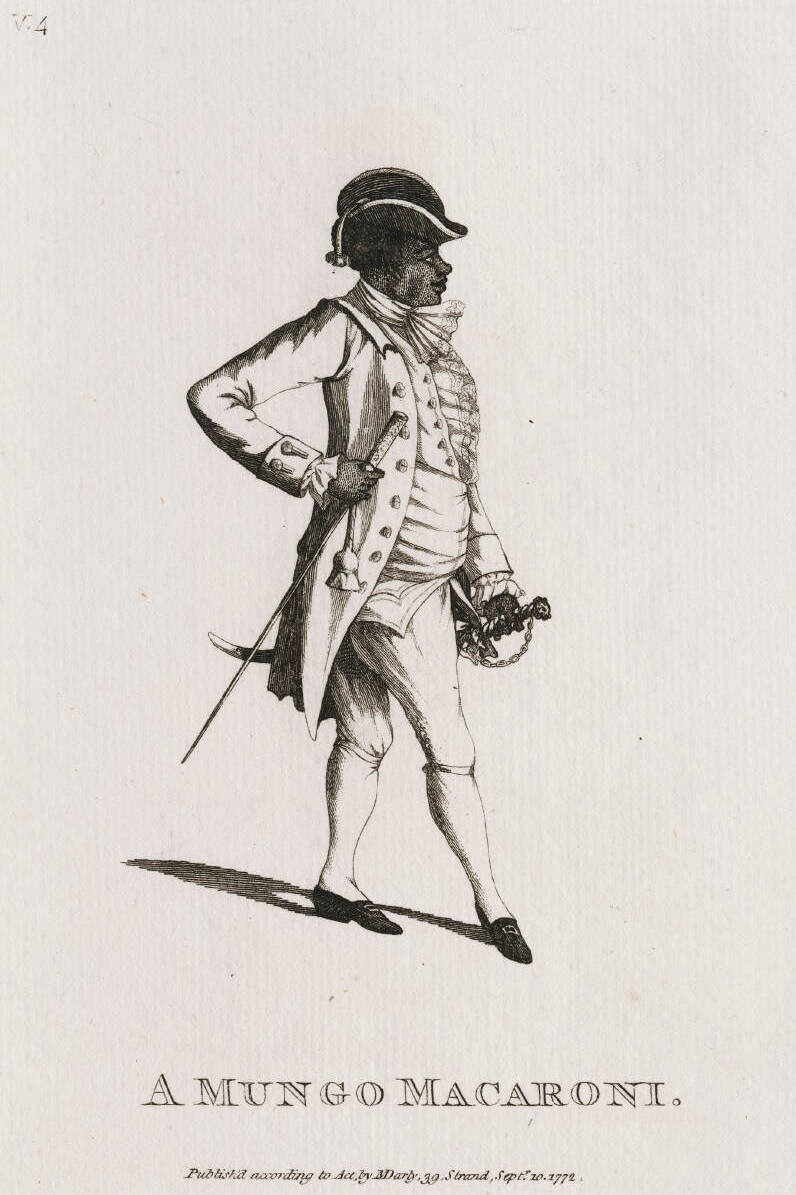
1772 caricature of Soubise

Julius Soubise (c. 1754 – 25 August 1798) was a Saint-Kittian-born socialite active in 18th-century London. Born in Saint Kitts into slavery, Soubise (then named Othello) was purchased by a Royal Navy captain before being brought to England in 1764, where the captain gave him to a relative, Catherine Douglas, Duchess of Queensberry. Othello was manumitted by Queensberry, who renamed him "Julius Soubise" after Charles, Prince of Soubise and lavished her favour on him. This allowed Soubise to enter British high society and live a life of luxury, in addition to serving as Queensberry's riding and fencing master. In 1777, Soubise fled England for India for unclear reasons, settling in Calcutta where he opened a unisex riding and fencing school. In 1798, Soubise died from injuries sustained while trying to break a horse.

== Biography ==
Soubise was born c. 1754 on Saint Kitts in the British West Indies, the son of an enslaved Jamaican woman. He was bought by Royal Navy Captain Stair Douglas and taken to England at the age of 10 under the name Othello. In 1764, he was given to Catherine Douglas, Duchess of Queensberry, a relative of Douglas and an eccentric emblem of London's high society, who manumitted him. He was renamed after Charles, Prince of Soubise by the Duchess. She gave Soubise a privileged life, treating him as if he were her own son – apparently with her husband Charles Douglas, 3rd Duke of Queensberry's blessing.

Trained by Domenico Angelo (whom Soubise also regularly accompanied as usher to Eton and Windsor), Soubise became the riding and fencing master to the Duchess. He became a popular acquaintance among young noblemen and rose as a figure in upper-class social circles, becoming the member of many fashionable clubs such as the Thatched House Club. The personal favour and patronage of the Duchess allowed Soubise a lifestyle of socializing and fashion. He would sometimes style himself as "Prince Ana-Ana-maboe" or "The Black Prince", claiming to be African royalty. It was rumoured that his relationship with the Duchess developed into a sexual one.

In the collected letters of the famous freed slave Ignatius Sancho, Letter XIIII (dated 11 October 1772) is addressed to Soubise, whom Sancho encourages to consider his lucky position as an unusually privileged black person and so live a more seemly life.

However, on 15 July 1777 Soubise fled Britain for India. Historical accounts dispute whether he was sent away simply to amend his debauchery or to evade a rape accusation from a maid of the Duchess’. The Duchess died two days after his departure. Once in India, he settled in Calcutta where he founded a fencing and riding school which was advertised as open to men and women students. The venture does not appear to have been successful, as records show multiple notices of insolvency, and Soubise was for a time imprisoned in a debtor's jail. In 1794, he married Catherine Pawson, the white daughter of a disgraced paymaster general with the East India Company. Contemporary accounts suggest it was a happy marriage. While in Calcutta he also fathered two known children, Mary and William Soubise. Based on dates, Catherine is likely to have been the mother of these children, though no mother was named in the baptism records. On 25 August 1798, Soubise fell while attempting to break in a horse. The fall came after a year of ailing health due to rheumatism, and he succumbed to his injuries, dying the following day at the age of 44.

== Caricature depictions ==
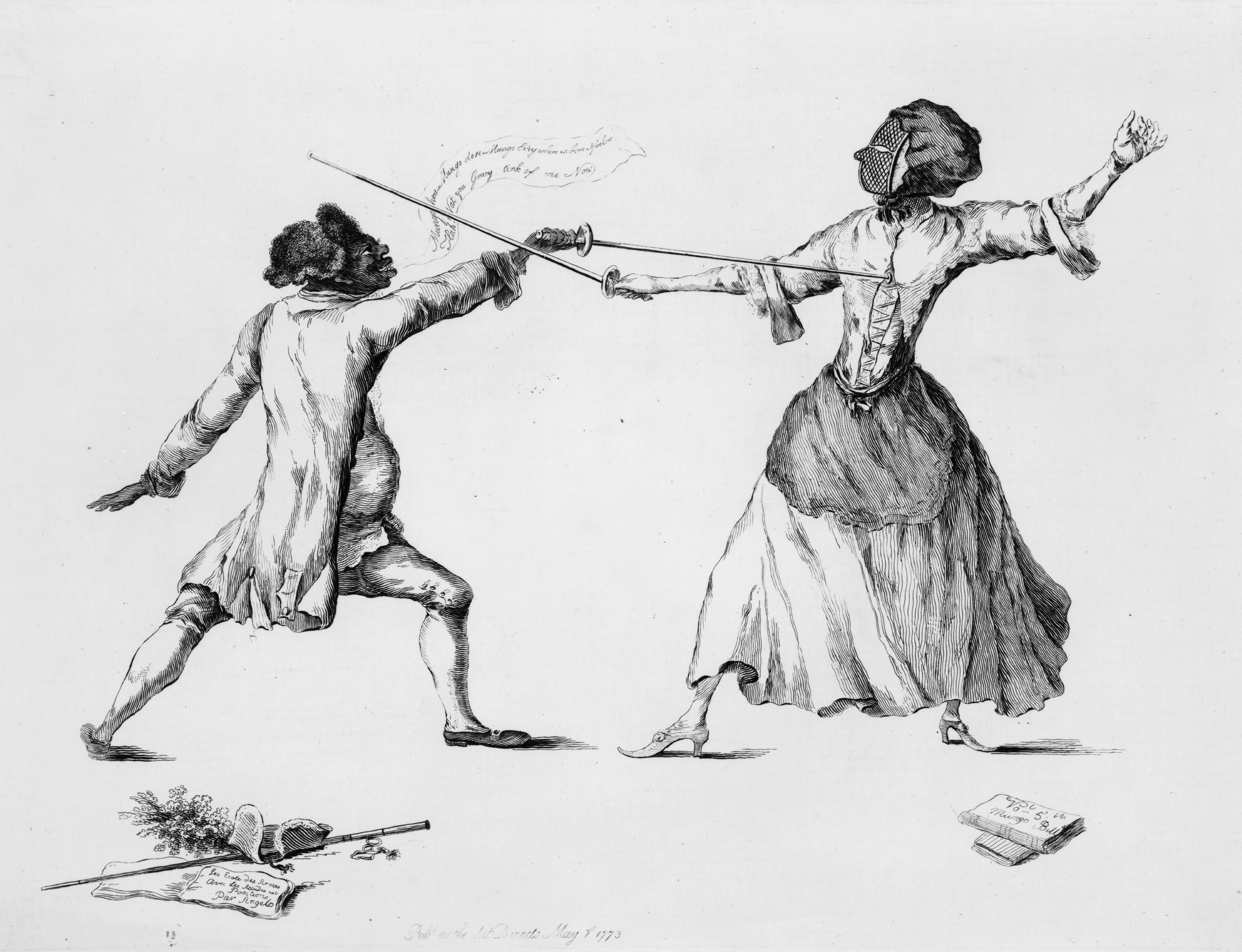
1773 cartoon of Soubise fencing with the Duchess of Queensberry

Soubise became socially prominent enough to become the subject of several caricatures. Most notably, Soubise is attributed as the muse for A Mungo Macaroni (published on 10 September 1772), part of a famous 1771–1773 satirical series of engravings depicting fashionable young men, published by Matthew and Mary Darly. The term "macaroni" was a contemporary name for a fashionable young man, a dandy, while "Mungo" was a name of an officious slave from the 1769 comic opera The Padlock by Isaac Bickerstaffe. In previous contexts, use of the term "mungo" was often aimed towards luxury slaves, an application of the character to those treated theatrically like elite's pets. Applying the epithet to Soubise in combination with "macaroni" was intended to mock the identity he had assumed for himself.

William Austin's 1773 satirical print, The Duchess of Queensbury and Soubise shows the pair engaged in a fencing match. Austin's engraving was based on illustrations of fencing compiled by the Angelo fencing dynasty, combined with accounts of Soubise from Henry Angelo’s memoir. These accounts were satirized by Austin in a way which addresses Soubise and the duchess’ uncustomary relationship, depicting Soubise as Mungo the servant. In the print, text shows Soubise saying, “Mungo here, Mungo dere, Mungo every where; Above and below. Hah! Vat your gracy tink of me now?,” direct lines from the Mungo character. This work has reappeared historically under several titles, including “The Eccentric Duchess of Queensbury fencing with her protégé the Creole Soubise (otherwise ‘Mungo’)” and “The Duchess of Queensberry playing at foils with her favourite Lap Dog Mungo after Expending near £10,000 to make him a—.”

== Arts and education ==
In his work as an actor, Soubise is suggested to have had runs in the role of Othello as well as the character Mungo from The Padlock, characters historically most often played by white actors in blackface. However, such reports come from Hicky's Bengal Gazette, which could have posited this satirically to mock Soubise's status. Soubise was strongly associated with these characters throughout his time in the elite social sphere, labelled by others because he was a black actor, punctuated by his depiction in A Mungo Macaroni.

Soubise received instruction in the privileged accomplishments of riding and fencing, taught by fencing master Domenico Angelo. He was also known as an amateur violinist, singer and actor – he was taught oration by the famous actor David Garrick.

== Fashion ==
Soubise's styles were likened to other fops of the time, often characterized by the French influence he also granted his namesake. A Mungo Macaroni depicts Soubise sporting a luxurious hat, ruffles, a cane, and an adorned sword. He was known to wear large powdered wigs, fine fabrics such as silk, and styles fitted tightly to his body. There are also accounts of him wearing diamond-buckled shoes with red heels. Such styles meant that Soubise and other fops were associated with effeminacy and excess, supported by the caricatures, but Soubise also assumed a unique black identity that could be associated with extravagance.

== See also ==
- Black British elite, the class that Soubise belonged to
