= The Way to Keep Him =

1760 comedy play by the Irish writer Arthur Murphy

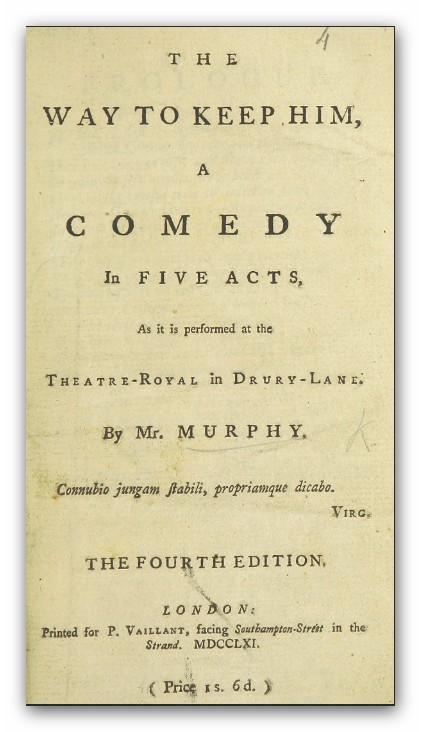
- Original language: English
- Written by: Arthur Murphy
- Genre: Comedy

Premiere
- Date: 24 January 1760
- Place: Theatre Royal, Drury Lane, London

The Way to Keep Him is a 1760 comedy play by the Irish writer Arthur Murphy. Originally three-acts in length, it premiered at the Drury Lane Theatre in a double bill with Murphy's The Desert Island. Actor-manager David Garrick appeared in both productions. A great success, the following year it was extended to five acts, with music composed by Thomas Arne to accompany it. It had many revivals well into the nineteenth century.

The original 1760 Drury Lane cast included Garrick as Lovemore, John Palmer as Sir Brilliant Fashion, Thomas King as William, Maria Macklin as Widow Bellmour, Mary Ann Yates as Mrs Lovemore, Mary Bradshaw as Mignionet and Kitty Clive as Muslin.

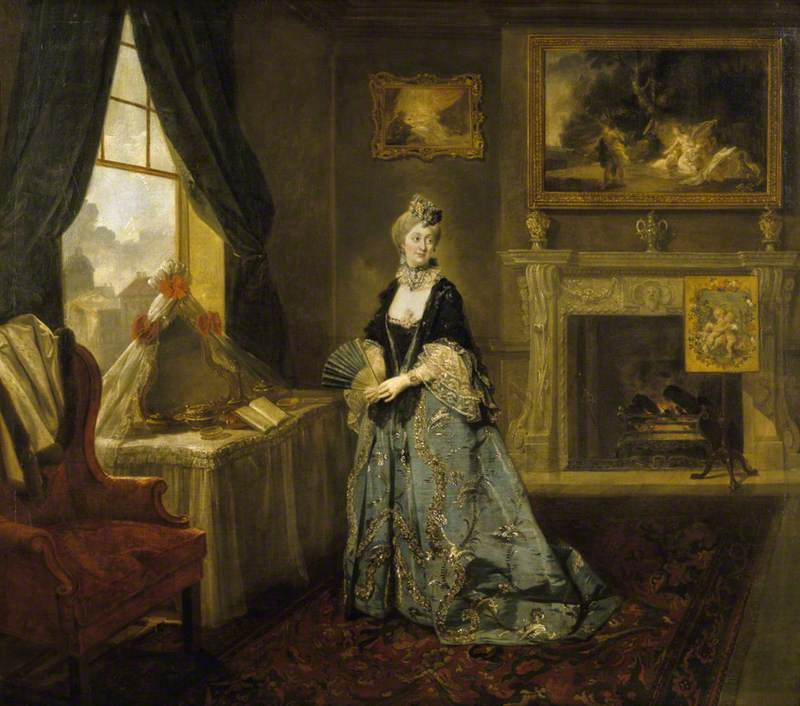
Johann Zoffany's depiction of Frances Barton as Widow Bellmour.

Writer Henry Angelo recalls attending an earth-bathing lecture in the early 1790s, during which quack doctor James Graham began reciting "Ye fair married Dames..." from the play at the urging of bored onlookers.

== Bibliography ==
- Baines, Paul & Ferarro, Julian & Rogers, Pat. The Wiley-Blackwell Encyclopedia of Eighteenth-Century Writers and Writing, 1660–1789. Wiley-Blackwell, 2011.
- Gilman, Todd. The Theatre Career of Thomas Arne. Rowman & Littlefield, 2013.
