= Portrait of Henry Angelo =

Painting by Mather Brown

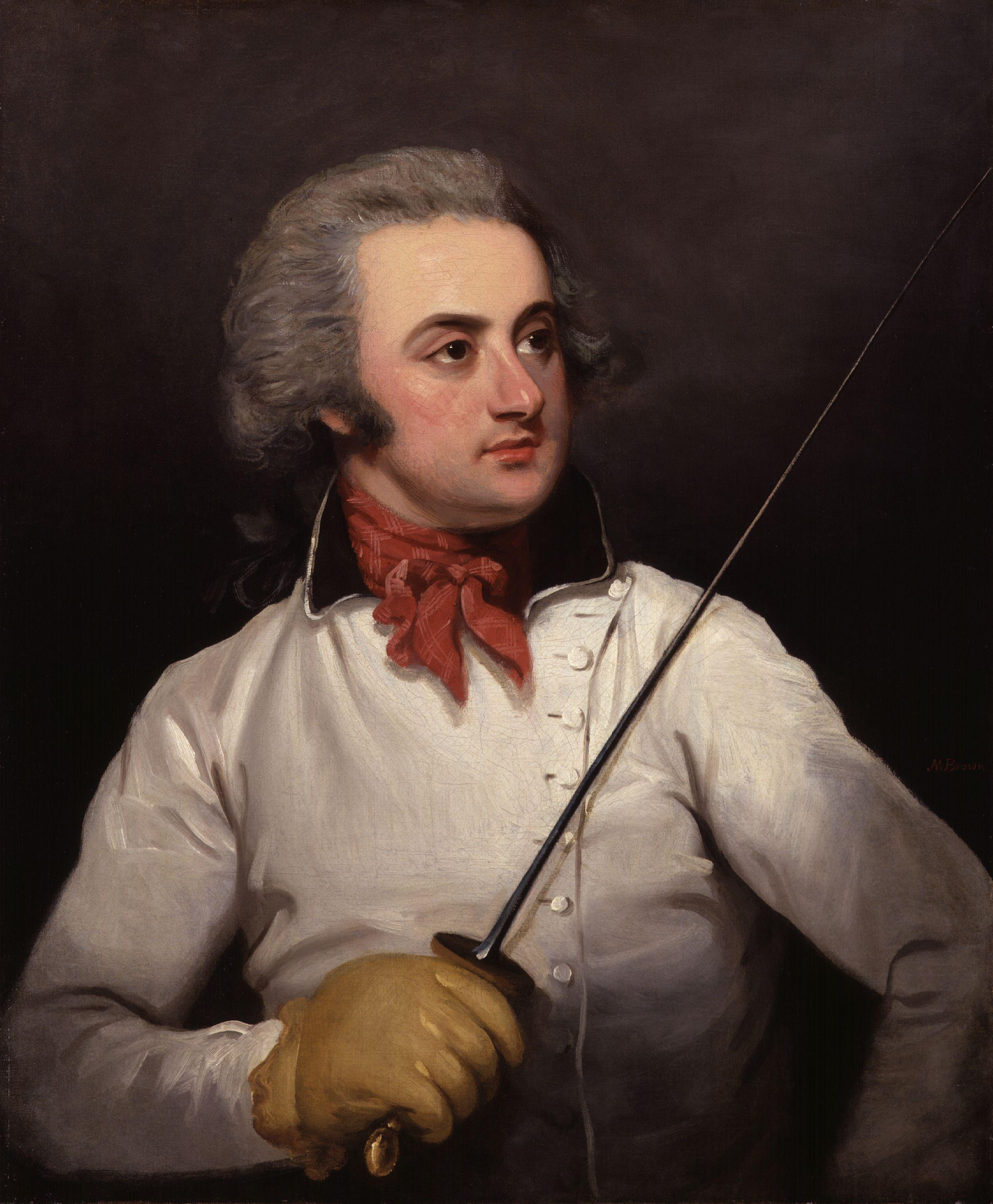
- Artist: Mather Brown
- Year: c. 1790
- Type: Oil on canvas, portrait painting
- Dimensions: 77.5 cm × 64.8 cm (30.5 in × 25.5 in)
- Location: National Portrait Gallery; London

Portrait of Henry Angelo is a c.1790 portrait painting by the American-born British artist Mather Brown. It depicts Henry Angelo the noted English fencing master.

Angelo was the son of the Italian Domenico Angelo and inherited his father's school of fencing in Bond Street in London. He trained many of Britain's elite in swordsmanship into the Regency era. In reference to this he is shown holding a sword. The painting is in the National Portrait Gallery off Trafalgar Square, having been purchased in 1980.

== Bibliography ==
- Brewer, William D. Representing and Interrogating Dueling, Caning, and Fencing During the British Romantic Period. Liverpool University Press, 2025.
- Crane, David. Romantics & Revolutionaries: Regency Portraits from the National Portrait Gallery London. National Portrait Gallery, 2002.
- Evans, Dorinda. Mather Brown, Early American Artist in England. Wesleyan University Press, 1982.
