= Alberto Bona =

Italian actor, playwright and film director

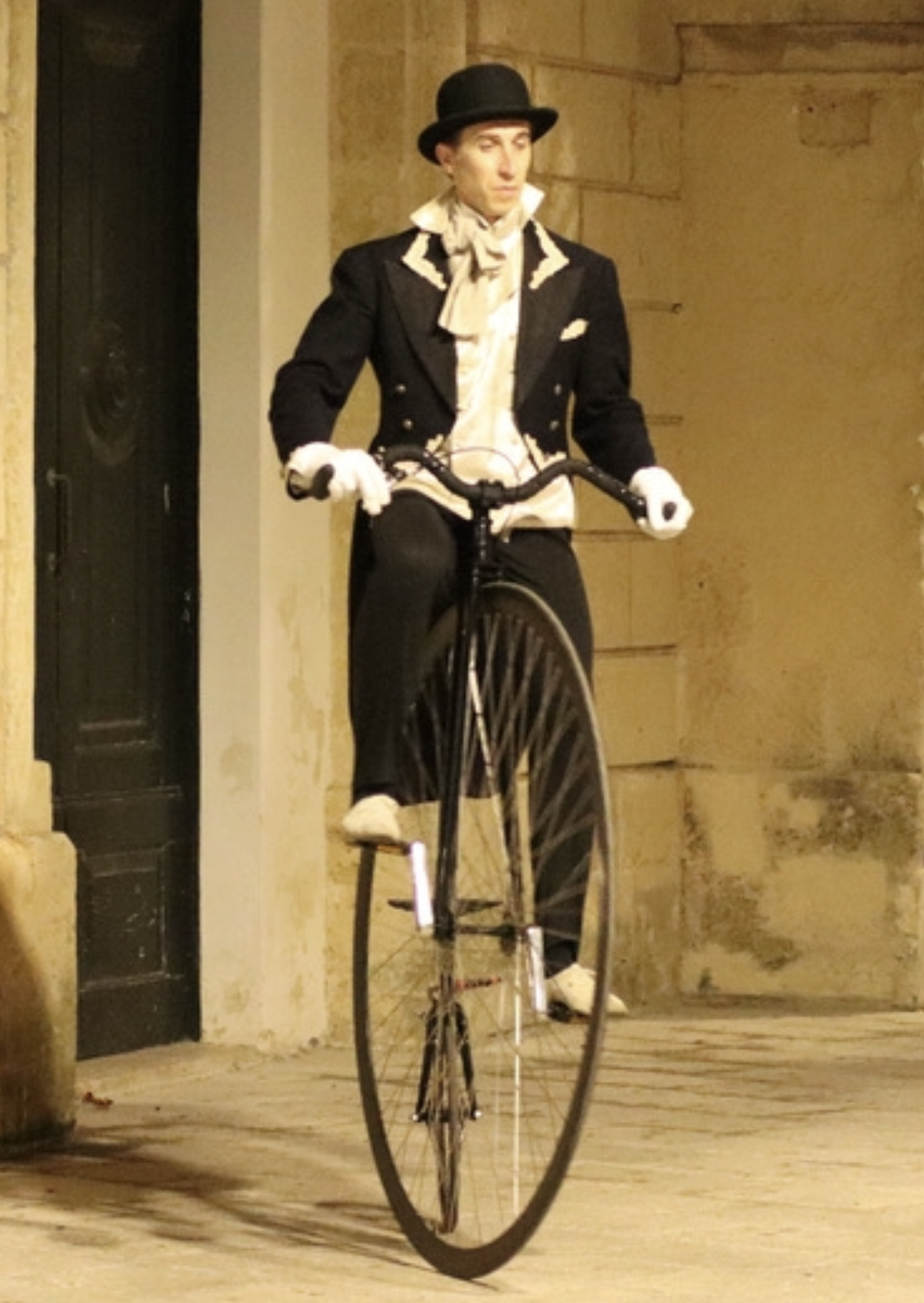
- Bona riding a Pennyfarthing during a stage production in Italy
- Born: 7 November 1978 (age 48); Italy
- Occupations: Actor, playwright, film director

Alberto Bona (born 7 November 1978) is an Italian actor, playwright, film director and multiple Pennyfarthing Guinness World Records holder.

== Biography ==
Alberto Bona started his career as a cartoonist in Italy, before moving to London, where he started to work within theatre and independent film productions. He wrote and starred in the surrealistic play Salvador! staged at the Barons Court Theatre in 2004, where he played surrealist Salvador Dalí. This play led the photographer Marco Sanges to ask Bona to pose for a series of portraits. It began a creative collaboration culminating with the art film Circumstances, awarded as 'Best Art Film' at the Portobello Film Festival in 2008. With Sanges, Bona co-directed Pondering of a lonely wonderer and La Sonnambula. Together, they have also worked at the Hackney Empire devising the surrealistic art exhibition Big Scenes.

Bona wrote and starred in the play "Tremamondo – The Angel of Fencing", directed by Giampaolo Zennaro, staged at the Teatro Carlo Goldoni (Livorno) in Livorno.

In 2014, Bona produced a film about Rachmaninoff's The Isle of the Dead.

== Opera, documentaries and music videos ==
Bona has worked with opera director Giampaolo Zennaro, both as his assistant and a video artist. Together they staged La fanciulla del West in Limoges, Rigoletto in Almería, Cavalleria Rusticana and Traviata in Livorno. Classical music has also inspired him to make documentaries, including Story of a Luthier.

Bona directed the music video for the song Meet me in Winter. The track and the video were produced by Ian Dean.

In 2021, he co-produced music videos for the rock band The Darkness alongside Frankie Poullain, including It's Love, Jim and Jussy's Girl, in which he also portrays a vicar.

== Pennyfarthing cycling records ==
Bona is an accomplished Pennyfarthing rider and has been involved with the Pennyfarthing Club since 2016.

On 11 October 2024, Bona set the one-hour record for greatest distance cycled on a Pennyfarthing with one leg, covering 20.294 km at the Herne Hill Velodrome in London. He remarked that he chose to attempt the record using only one leg "because doing it with two legs was too easy".

He is also the co-holder of two Guinness World Records: the largest Pennyfarthing race in a velodrome and the longest stack, with 140 participants.

== Filmography ==
=== Actor ===
- Agatha and the storm (Agata e la tempesta) (2004)
- Dermo sluchaetsa (2006)
- Cat's smack (2007)
- The scrupulous torment of the polite man (L'uomo garbato) (2008)
- Pondering of a lonely wonderer (Pensieri di un viandante solitario) (2008)
- Circumstances (2008)
- L'Assenza (2013)
- My Trigger (2016)
- Sugar (2018)
- Piercing Stillness (2019)
- The Darkness: Jussy's Girl (2021)
- Acts of Memory (2024)

=== Director ===
- The scrupulous torment of the polite man (L'uomo garbato) (2008)
- Pondering of a lonely wonderer (Pensieri di un viandante solitario) (2008)
- The sleepwalking girl (La sonnambula) (2009)
- Story of a luthier (Storia di un liutaio) (2009)
- So in Love (2010)
- Elgar Cello Concerto (2011)
- Meet me in Winter (2011)
