= Zennaro =

Zennaro is an Italian surname. It's one of the most common surnames of the metropolitan city of Venice. Notable people with the surname include:

- Franco Zennaro (born 1993), Belgian footballer
- Giampaolo Zennaro (born c. 1940), Italian opera director
- Matteo Zennaro (born 1976), Italian fencer
