= Henry Angelo =

English fencer, memoirist, and member of the fencing Angelo Family

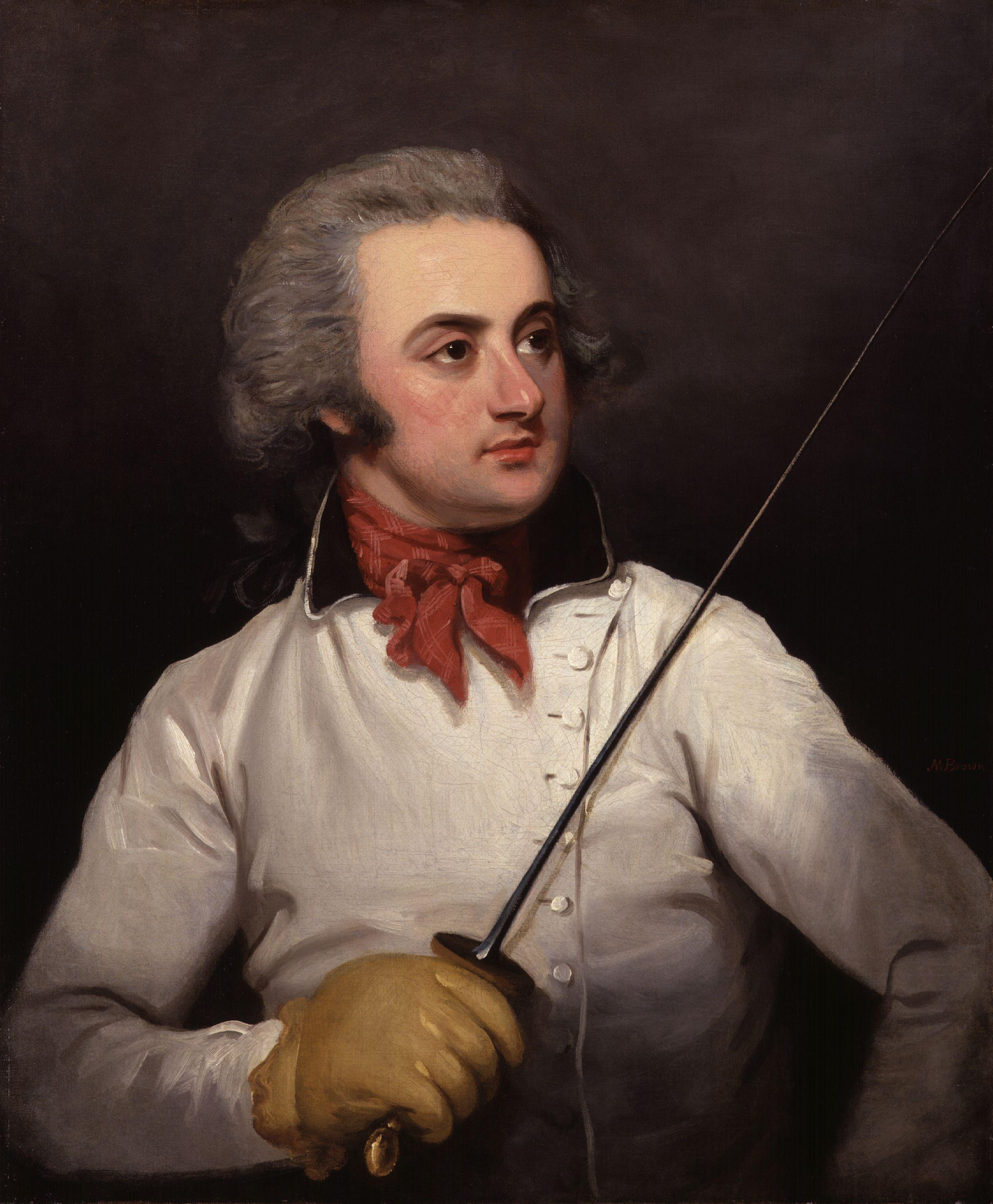
Portrait of Henry Angelo by Mather Brown, c. 1790.

Henry Charles William Angelo (1756–1835) was an English memoirist and fencing master, as a member of the Angelo family of fencers and son of the Italian master, Domenico Angelo.

As the leader of his father's Angelo School of Arms from 1780 to 1817, he consolidated its status among London's high society, with upper class patronage and a cult of celebrity. He also maintained his family's reputation, reissuing his father's seminal fencing manual and composing several memoirs and a single work on fencing himself.

== Biography ==
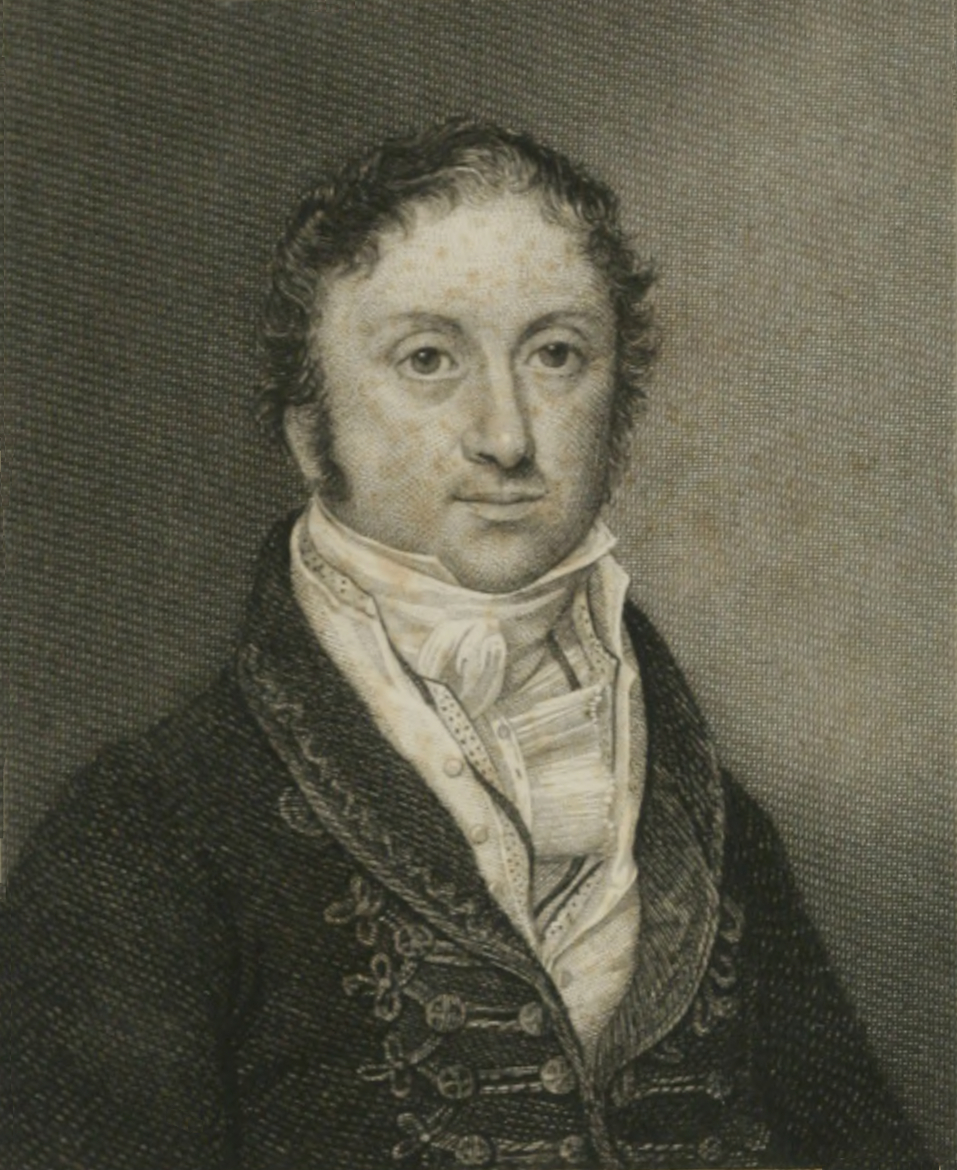
Henry Angelo in the frontispiece to his Reminiscences of Henry Angelo (1828).

Henry Charles William Malevolti was born on 5 April 1756 at St James's Place, Piccadilly, London. His baptismal surname was Malevolti, but in the late 1750s, he became known as Angelo, following his father's adoption of the surname. Angelo was born to the Italian-born fencing master, Domenico Angelo (1717–1802), and his wife, Elizabeth née Johnson (1738–1805). Domenico Angelo's school of fencing "dominated Europe's fencing scene for well over 100 years", according to fencing master Nick Evangelista.

Angelo grew up among four sisters and one brother, as the eldest child of the family. He attended first William Rose's school in Chiswick and then, in 1764, Eton College (where his father taught fencing). In 1772, he began his formal training as a fencer, practicing swordsmanship under a Monsieur Motet in Paris, a man then known in the Continent as "the greatest living fencer", according to Egerton Castle. By 1775, he had returned to England to become his father's principal assistant.

On 23 October 1778, against the wishes of his family, he married Mary Bowman Swindon of West Auckland at St Anne's, Soho. They had their first child in 1799, with the Duke of York agreeing to be the child's godfather (the Duke already being Angelo's reputed godfather). Angelo had four sons, the second of whom, Henry Charles Angelo (1780–1852), became a fencing master himself, maintaining the family's reputation.

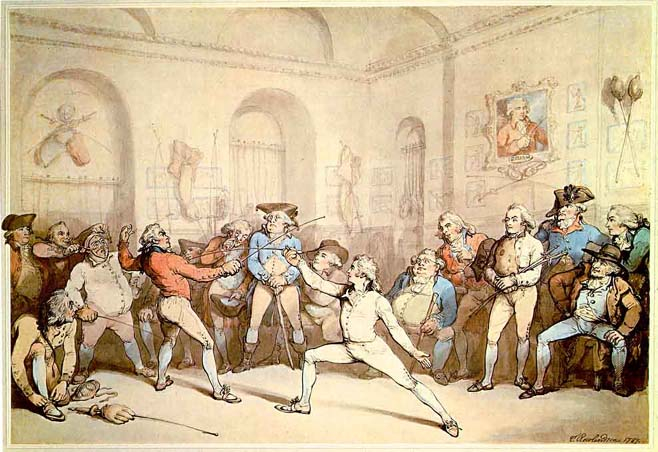
'I shall conquer this', 1787, by Thomas Rowlandson. One of several dramatic prints by Angelo's friend, Rowlandson, depicting Angelo's swordsmanship.

In 1780, Domenico Angelo retired from his fencing school, the Angelo School of Arms, and was supplanted by his son, Henry Angelo. Shortly after assuming control, Angelo moved the school's premises to Her Majesty's Theatre, Haymarket. Angelo specialised in cavalry swordsmanship, with his patrons including the London and Westminster Light Horse Volunteers. During his time, Angelo consolidated the academy's status within London high society, utilising a "combination of sportsmanship, celebrity, and royal and noble patronage", according to Malcolm Fare of the Oxford Dictionary of National Biography. Here, in 1787, Angelo's friend and popular caricaturist, Thomas Rowlandson, produced a set of watercolours depicting Angelo's swordsmanship, illustrating several of his most distinguished students looking on (including Charles James Fox and The Marquess of Buckingham). In 1787, Angelo reissued his father's L'école des armes (1763), with fencing illustrations copied from Diderot's Encyclopédie, under the title The School of Fencing. This volume has been described by Evangelista "the all-time classic volume on the subject of swordplay" and "a work of immense influence".

On 17 June 1789, Her Majesty's Theatre was burned down and Angelo was forced to move to new premises, in 13 Bond Street, which he occupied alongside the boxer John Jackson. Angelo did not settle during his final years of teaching, tutoring at around forty schools in total, before an injury by actor Edmund Kean in 1817 forced him into retirement. The management of the school was then passed to his son, Henry Charles Angelo. Angelo died at Twickenham in 1835.

In his retirement, Angelo was a memoirist and, like his father, a writer on fencing. In 1817, he reissued his father's School of Fencing, under the title A Treatise on the Utility and Advantages of Fencing, with a biography of his friend, the composer and fencer Chevalier de Saint-Georges, appended. He reminisced of his life in London's high society in two memoirs: The Reminiscences of Henry Angelo (1828) and Angelo's Pic Nic; or, Table Talk (1834), ignoring discussion of fencing career for more conventional anecdotes, many of questionable veracity. Angelo claimed in his Reminiscences to have created a decoupage screen featuring cut-out prints of boxers on one side that was once owned by Lord Byron, one of his fencing students, now in the National Portrait Gallery, London. In the same body of work, he described an earth-bathing lecture conducted by quack doctor James Graham and the positive reception Graham received from influential "persons ... in the fashionable world."

Angelo published one original work on fencing, Hungarian and Highland Broadsword (1798), illustrated with 24 watercolours by Rowlandson, many depicting Angelo on horseback.

== Sources ==
- Evangelista, Nick (1995). The Encyclopedia of the Sword. Greenwood Publishing Group. ISBN 9780313278969.
- Fare, Malcolm (2013). "Angelo, Domenico [formerly Angiolo Domenico Maria Tremamondo] (1717–1802)". Oxford Dictionary of National Biography (online ed.). Oxford University Press. doi:10.1093/ref:odnb/544. (Subscription, Wikipedia Library access or UK public library membership required.)
- Seccombe, Thomas (1899). "Tremamondo, Domenico Angelo Malevolti" . In Lee, Sidney (ed.). Dictionary of National Biography. Vol. 57. London: Smith, Elder & Co.
