= Domenico Angelo =

Italian fencer

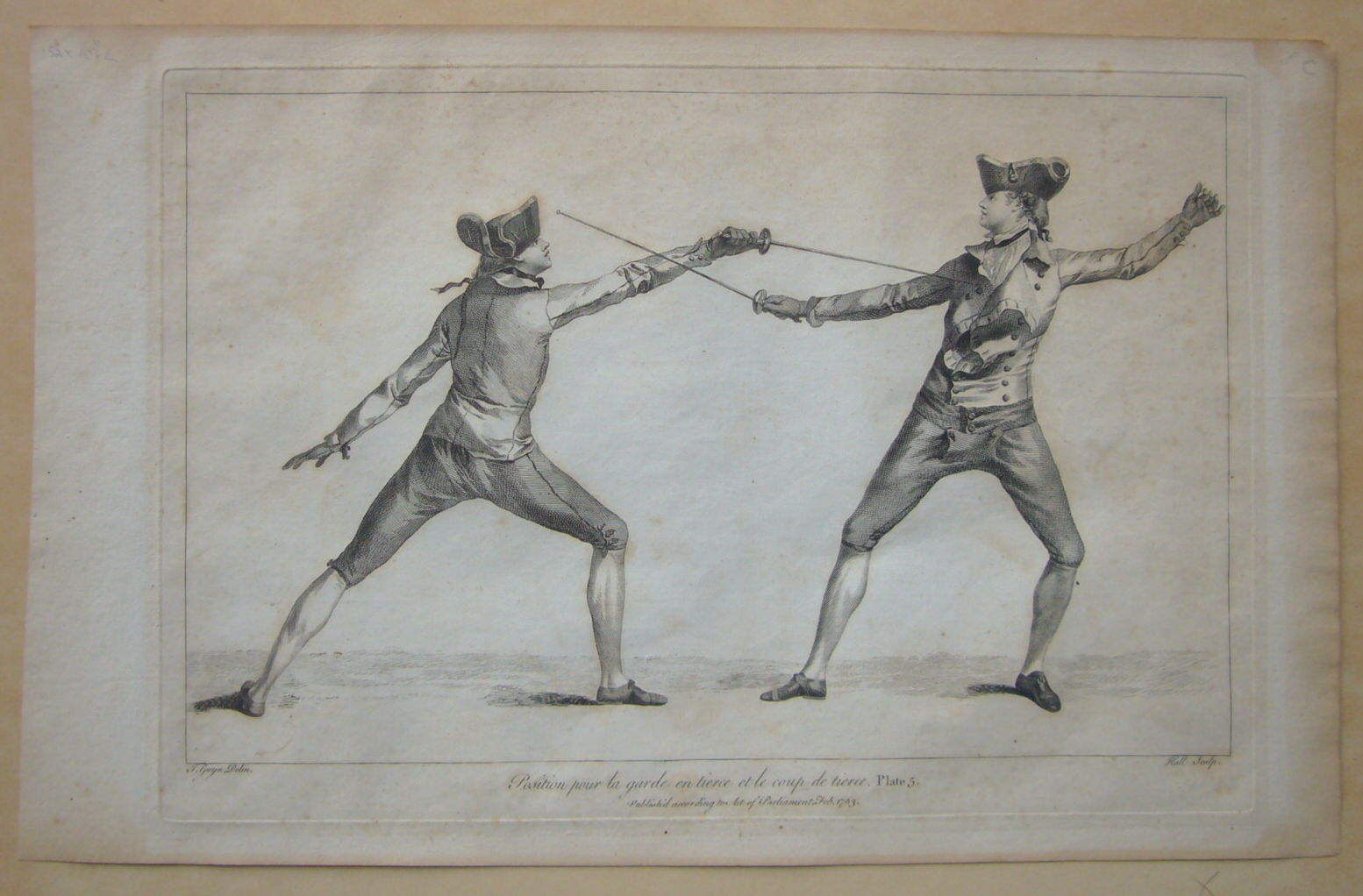
1763 fencing print from Angelo Domenico's instruction book

Domenico Angelo (1716 Livorno, Grand Duchy of Tuscany – 1802, Twickenham, England), was an Italian sword and fencing master who became the celebrated swordsman of mid-eighteenth English society. He earned fame not only with his brilliant skills as a swordsman but also because of his famous fencing school in Soho Square, London. He was also the founder of the Angelo Family of fencers. He has been praised as "the first to emphasize fencing as a means of developing health, poise, and grace. As a result of his insight and influence, fencing changed from an art of war to a sport."

== Early life ==
Angelo Domenico Malevolti Tremamondo was born in Leghorn in 1716, the son of Giacomo Tremamondo, a wealthy local merchant who worked in via del Giardino, and Caterina Angela Malevolti, a Neapolitan marquess. His father was born in 1688 in Foggia and later moved to Leghorn, then a thriving commercial port of the Grand Duchy of Tuscany. Giacomo was already resident in Leghorn on 3 December 1713, as evidenced by his marriage certificate in the cathedral of Leghorn, a document cited in an English volume on the ancestors of his son Angelo. Angelo was born three years after his father's marriage and was trained in fencing from an early age.

Angelo received his initial training in the Italian method of fencing in Pisa. At the time, the discipline was not only a sport but was also regarded as a practical means of defence. According to one account, he may have been involved in multiple duels in Leghorn and elsewhere in Tuscany, some of which ended fatally for his opponents, and he left Italy to avoid reprisals from their relatives.

== Travels ==
Angelo moved to Paris at the age of 27, with an eye to taking over the family business, but instead gained fencing skills when he attended the famous fencing school of Bertrand Teillagorry. Angelo studied the classical French style with the foil at the Royal Association of Masters of Yielding Weapons of the City and Suburbs of Paris under the guidance of Teillagory, who also trained Chevalier d'Éon.

In 1750, he began an affair with a well-known English actress Peg Woffington, who was on tour in Paris, and accompanied her back to London and Dublin. However, the affair cooled and on 5 February 1755, he instead married the 17-year-old Elizabeth Johnson (1738–1805), with whom he had several children.

== Fencing tuition ==
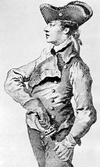
Domenico Angelo (1760 c.ca)

In London, he quickly established his reputation as an excellent swordsman, expert fencer, and undisputed winner of many duels, and therefore, he eventually gained the patronage of Henry Herbert, 10th Earl of Pembroke, and three years later, in 1758, Angelo became a fencing master of the British royal family after he gained the patronage of the dowager Princess of Wales, who appointed him as riding and fencing master to George, Prince of Wales, and his brother Edward, duke of York.

By then he already had established a fencing school, Angelo's School of Arms in Carlisle House, Soho, London. Thanks to his skill of Master Angelo, as he was named in England, his school immediately became famous and was attended over the years by the most illustrious personalities of the British capital of the time, such as the painters Joshua Reynolds, Thomas Gainsborough and George Stubbs, the actor David Garrick, as well as Giacomo Casanova, the Chevalier d'Éon, and the future King William IV. His school was also famous for accepting female students, some of whom were actresses from London theatres who first accompanied their male colleagues and then decided to take lessons. In 1760, Angelo handed over his school to a son, and established himself at the prestigious Eton College, where his family continued to teach fencing for three more generations. In the second half of the 19th century, Angelo's school was still run by his descendants.

In 1763 he bought Carlisle House, Soho Square, where he taught the aristocracy the fashionable art of swordsmanship. One of his tenants there was the composer Johann Christian Bach, youngest son of Johann Sebastian Bach and harpsichord instructor to the Queen.

With the help of artist Gwyn Delin, he had a fencing instruction book, L'École des armes'' (English: The School of Fencing), published in England in 1763, which included colorful didactic sketches by London's most accomplished illustrators, with 25 engraved plates demonstrating the various classic positions and techniques from the old schools of fencing. It was published in French and then also in English, and some historians have suggested that the Chevalier d'Éon, who had joined Angelo in London, may have assisted with the French text. This placed its "emphasis on fencing as a source of gentlemanly exercise rather than as a necessary preparation for duel". This folio very successful in its time and a collector's item today.

Angelo's teaching methods, while not original, were methodical and solid, employing a combination of moves that were useful for both practice and duelling.

== Family ==
Angelo was the founder of the Angelo Family, a dynasty of fencing masters who "dominated Europe's fencing scene for well over 100 years", according to fencing master Nick Evangelista.

By his wife Elizabeth Johnson, Angelo had at least six children:

1. Henry Charles William, born 5 April 1756. Also a fencing master, father of Henry Charles Angelo the Younger.
2. Florella Sophia, born 1759, Dame at Eton.
3. Anne Caroline Eliza, born 1763.
4. Catherine Elizabeth, born 1766, married to Mark Drury, Second Master at Harrow school, and brother of Joseph Drury, Headmaster of Harrow. She was mother to William James Joseph Drury.
5. Elizabeth Tremamondo, born 1768.
6. George Xavier Tremamondo, born 1773.

There was perhaps also a son called Michael Angelo.

== Death ==
After serving as the fencing teacher at Eton College for several years, Angelo died in Eton on 11 July 1802, at the venerable age of 85. His son Henry replaced him in the direction of the family fencing school in 1780.

== Legacy ==
- The play "Tremamondo - The Angel of Fencing", written by Alberto Bona and directed by Giampaolo Zennaro, was staged at the Teatro Carlo Goldoni, in Domenico Angelo's native town of Leghorn.
