= Earth-bathing =

British alternative medicine fad

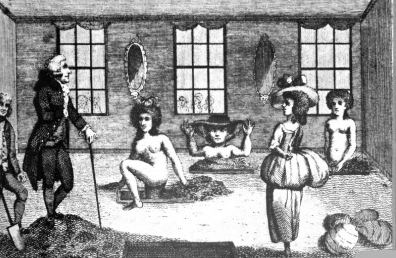
A sketch of the quack doctor or "sexologist" James Graham with some of his patients at the earthbaths in Panton Street in London.

Earth-bathing is the therapeutic practice of immersing the human body in soil (or freshly dug earth). It emerged as a distinctive form of alternative medicine in the late eighteenth century.

Although variations of mud-based treatments exist today in spas and beauty regimens, the earliest robust advocacy for earth-bathing as a universal cure came from the Scottish medical enthusiast James Graham. His writings, lectures, and treatments positioned the practice as "all-cleansing, all-healing, all-vigorating," and he promoted it as a remedy for a wide range of diseases that he believed were curable by nature.

== Early history ==
Gerard van Swieten mentioned this practice in his commentaries on the aphorisms of Herman Boerhaave, the historical belief found within some medical traditions of the Kingdom of Granada. By balneum terrae, or "bath of earth," individuals would be buried up to their neck to cure phthisis (commonly known as pulmonary tuberculosis).

== Background ==
James Graham studied medicine at the University of Edinburgh, receiving instruction from respected physicians such as Alexander Monro and William Cullen However, Graham did not complete his degree and never became a licensed physician. His career later spanned Yorkshire, Scotland, New York, Philadelphia, Paris, and the Isle of Man. He eventually settled in London, where he specialized in sexual problems using highly unorthodox methods. By 1783, Graham began to attract great "rage and curiosity" at his Temple of Health in Pall Mall. His remedies were often denounced as quackery, yet he gained a measure of fame for their novelty and boldness.

Graham introduced earth-bathing during the latter part of the 1780s, and published A Short Treatise on the All-Cleansing, All-Healing, All-Vigorating Qualities of the Earth in 1790, in which he laid out the central ideas of the treatment.

=== Theories and beliefs ===
Graham’s advocacy of earth-bathing rested on his broader view of the Earth as a living organism. (Note: Although writing long before later ecological theories (such as Vladimir Vernadsky’s "biosphere" or James Lovelock’s "Gaia hypothesis"), Graham conceived the planet as "a great, an huge Animal, or living System.") Stemming from the Christian cosmological belief that humanity was formed from the ground, he hypothesized that humans must be a microcosm of this larger organism, and furthermore, a prolonged disconnection led to humoral and elemental imbalances that manifested as disease.

Graham believed that human bodies could draw vitality from direct contact with the soil and allowed the body's internal heat and moisture to recalibrate. He further argued that a prolonged exposure to the soil opened the pores, removed bodily "toxins," and restored natural vigor. (Note: According to Graham's treatise, the coldness of the earth removed "morbid or preternatural heat"; the "soapy moisture" of the soil extracted "morbid humours"; and, the freshness of the earth nourished the human body in the same way that it nourishes plants.)

== Treatment ==
=== Procedure ===
Earth-bathing, or what Graham also termed "animal purification," involved the following basic procedure:

- The therapy required a patient to be stripped completely naked and immersed in freshly dug earth or sand up to the neck, "up to the chin, or lips," or even entirely covered except for the eyes and nose to allow free breathing.
- Recommended sessions lasted three, six, or twelve hours, and could be repeated daily for weeks.
- Fasting was preferred, though Graham permitted a glass or two of wine or thick oatmeal gruel during the procedure.
- Morning was considered the optimal time for digging the trench and beginning the immersion.
- Patients were encouraged not to remain silent. Singing or speaking aloud was believed to assist recovery: the "bellows-like motion" of the chest and abdomen supposedly maintained heat, expelled disease, and drew in vitality.

Additionally, Graham did not consider all soil equally effective, instead favoring loam from hills and mountains, believed to be purer and more "salubrious"; brown or reddish earth; or soil that was light, sandy, crumbly, mellow, and marrowy. He advised avoiding blue, black, yellow, or white soil, which he regarded as inferior or unhealthy for the practice.

=== Proposed health benefits ===
Graham's treatment was proposed as a remedy for spasms, convulsions, and nervous afflictions; as well as leprosy, rheumatism, and consumption. He also advertised earth-bathing as a cure for gout, scurvy, and cancer.

In addition to these disease-related claims, Graham argued that earth-bathing suppressed appetite. He advised obese patients to bury themselves up to the lips for extended periods (sometimes up to six hours) in order to curb hunger and promote weight loss.

Graham's treatise also criticized physicians, surgeons, and chemists. (Note: Page 9 of Graham's treatise reads, "... we fhall have but very little reafon to applaud their Art, or to follow their fteps. Indeed, if an entire ftranger was to pick out the uglieft, aurkwardeft, proudeft, molt deiltical, molt profane, molt Cadaverous, and molt tickly-like men in any large town, or company, he would on enquiry find, that three-fourths of them were Chemifts, Phyficians, Philofophers, Surgeons, and Apothecaries.") It claims that they relied upon unnatural, poisonous, or overly complex medicines, whereas nature provides simple, universal cures.

=== Case studies and demonstrations ===
Graham offered accounts of his own extensive experience with the practice. He claimed to have undergone earth-bathing nearly one hundred times, seldom for fewer than five or six hours per session. At Pontefract, he reportedly engaged in eight consecutive daily immersions of six hours each, followed by a ninth day of twelve hours without conventional food or drink. He described himself as having absorbed sustenance "like a very glutton at a million pores," and upon washing and eating afterward, felt "rejuvenated, and primely invigorated."

Graham insisted that earth-bathing had been "actually practiced" with "infallible success" by "Sea-faring Foreigners" and "natives of Great Britain." In his 1790 treatise, he presented case studies as evidence of earth-bathing’s effectiveness. One example involved a young man from Newcastle who suffered from a chronic "scrophulous complaint," with glandular and joint swellings, severe eye inflammation, sensitivity to light, and continuous discharge of "hot sharp water or corrupted matter." After other therapies including conventional medicines and sea-bathing had failed, Graham claimed the young man was "perfectly cured" through daily immersion in earth.

To further preempt skepticism, many of Graham's sessions were conducted publicly, drawing Londoners who paid admission to witness the event. For a shilling, spectators could watch Graham and a naked female companion being buried together in a garden bed. He also famously delivered lectures while buried to the neck in soil, primary in Panton Street, Haymarket.

One of these events was later recalled by writer Henry Angelo, who described assistants shoveling earth around Graham as he removed his shirt and allowed the soil to rise to his chin. Angelo stated that the display was aimed particularly at the "credulous part of the public." In Angelo's recollection, some men, perhaps protecting the ladies’ modesty or simply bored, seemed to grow impatient. A group began calling out, "Doctor, a song! A song!" Graham complied, singing popular theatrical song "Ye fair married Dames..." from The Way to Keep Him.

== Reception and legacy ==
Rooted in Graham’s broader program of unconventional therapies, earth-bathing attracted curiosity, controversy, and public spectacle in London during the 1780s and early 1790s. According to witness Henry Angelo, the exhibition was not only tolerated but encouraged. He further claimed that many in "the fashionable world" supported Graham’s efforts, but expressed disbelief that such a performance occurred in an "enlightened country." Historian Roy Porter noted that while Graham is often portrayed as a charlatan, he was more accurately an "enthusiast" whose extreme views reflected broader contemporary trends.

By the mid-1790s, Graham’s earth-bathing fad began to wane. By this time he had begun to show signs of mental instability, possibly to opium addiction. Graham eventually returned to Scotland, where he died suddenly in June 1794 while pursuing a new health regimen focused on fasting. He was buried at Greyfriars Kirkyard in Edinburgh.

Earth-bathing ultimately did not become a mainstream medical practice, but similar contemporary pseudoscientific treatments include earthing mats and Japanese cedar enzyme baths.

Graham’s books, including those on earth-bathing, survive today and have been digitized by the Medical Heritage Library.

== See also ==
- James Graham (sexologist)
- Quackery
- Alternative medicine
- History of alternative medicine
- Balneotherapy
- Mud bath
- Healthcare in London
