= Marco Sanges =

Italian photographer

Marco Sanges is a photographer from Ostia, Rome. He has worked for Vogue Italia, Dolce&Gabbana, and published on several art and fashion magazines such as Sunday Telegraph.

== Biography ==
Sanges lives in London, where he is known for his publications and exhibitions. He often works with filmmaker Alberto Bona, with whom he co-directed Pondering of a Lonely Wonderer and La sonnambula. His photographic book Circumstances became a film, awarded at the Portobello Film Festival in 2008. Sanges is now developing the project Portraits, whose preview appeared on the website of la Repubblica. His exhibition Big Scenes has been hosted at the Hackney Empire.

== Works ==
=== Books ===
- 2004
  - Circumstances

=== Films ===
- 2008
  - Circumstances
  - Pondering of a lonely wonderer
- 2009
  - La sonnambula
