= Mary and Matthew Darly =

English printsellers and caricaturists

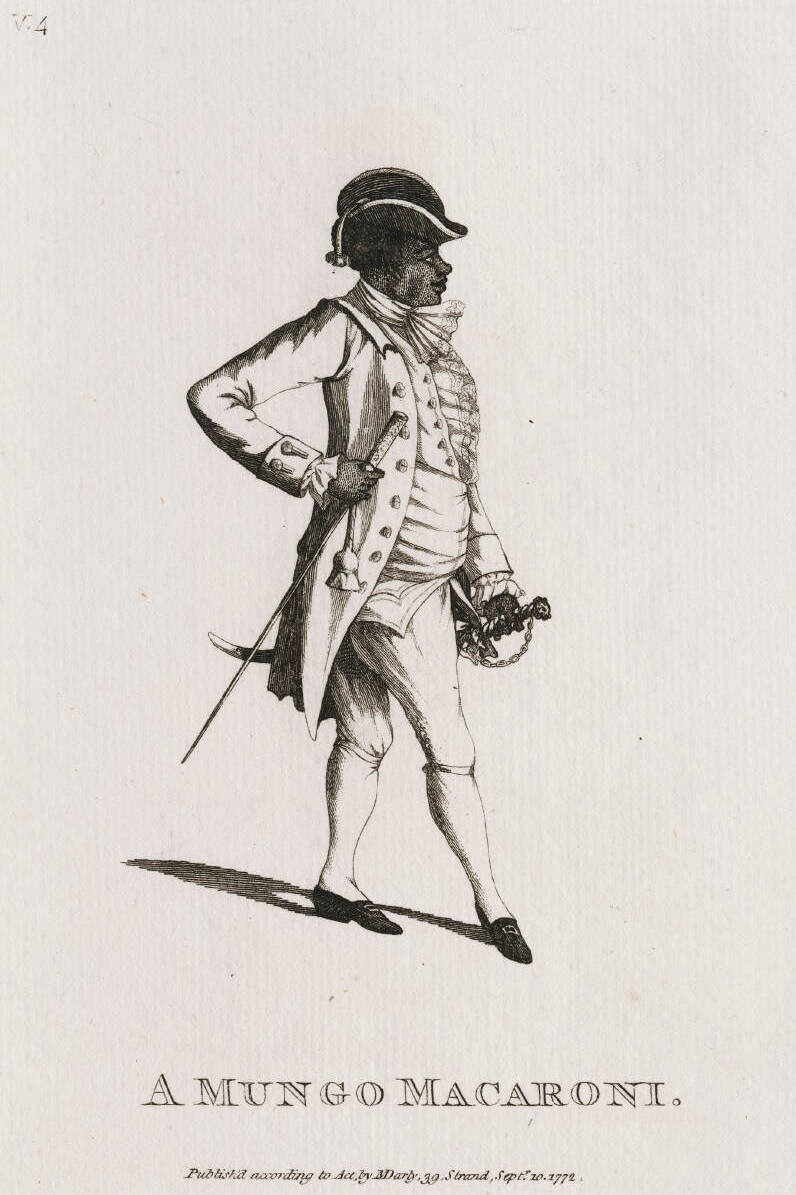
Caricature of Julius Soubise published by the Darlys on 10 September 1772

Mary and Matthew Darly were English printsellers and caricaturists during the 1770s. Mary Darly (fl. 1756–1779) was a printseller, caricaturist, artist, engraver, writer, and teacher. She wrote, illustrated, and published the first book on caricature drawing, A Book of Caricaturas [sic] (c. 1762), aimed at "young gentlemen and ladies." Mary was the wife of Matthew Darly, also called Matthias (fl. 1741–1778), a London printseller, furniture designer, and engraver. Mary was evidently the second wife of Matthew; his first was named Elizabeth Harold.

== Matthew Darly ==
Apprenticed to the clockmaker Umfraville Sampson in 1735, Darly himself took on four apprentices between 1752 and 1778. During the first part of his career, Matthew Darly moved from one part of the Strand to other, but he always called his shops the "Acorn" or the "Golden Acorn." He acquired fame when he moved into furniture designs and caricature. It was written of Richard Cosway that "so ridiculously foppish did he become that Matth. Darly the famous caricature print seller, introduced an etching of him in his window in the Strand as the ‘Macaroni Miniature Painter.'"

Matthias Darly not only issued political caricatures, but designed ceilings, chimney pieces, mirror frames, girandoles, decorative panels and other furnishing accessories, He engraved many of Thomas Chippendale's designs for The Gentleman and Cabinet-Maker's Director (plates dated 1753 and 1754, and plates in the second edition, 1762), and sold his own productions over the counter. The first publication which can be attributed to him with certainty is a colored caricature, The Cricket Players of Europe (1741). In 1754, with a partner, Edwards, he issued A New Book of Chinese Designs, which was intended to minister to the passing craze for furniture and household decorations in the fanciful chinoiserie style, and also included some Rococo whimsical chairs and tables to be made out of gnarled roots. It was in this year that he engraved many of the plates for Chippendale's Director. A New Book of Ceilings followed in 1760. He published from many addresses, most of them in the Strand or its immediate neighborhood, and his shop was for a long period perhaps the most important of its kind in London.

Darly was for many years in partnership with a man named Edwards, and together they published many political prints, which were originally issued separately and collected annually into volumes under the title of Political and Satirical History. Darly was a member both of the Incorporated Society of Artists and the Free Society of Artists, forerunners and unsuccessful rivals of the Royal Academy, and to their exhibitions he contributed many architectural drawings, together with a profile etching of himself (1775). Upon one of these etchings, published from 39 Strand, he is described as Professor of Ornament to the Academy of Great Britain.

Darly's most important publication was The Ornamental Architect or Young Artist's Instructor...Consisting of the Five Orders drawn with their Embellishments (1770–1771), a title which was changed in the edition of 1773 to A Compleat Body of Architecture, embellished with a great Variety of Ornaments. He also issued Sixty Vases by English, French and Italian Masters (1767). In addition to his immense mass of other productions Darly executed many book plates, illustrated various books and cabinet-makers' catalogues, and gave lessons in etching.

His skill as a caricaturist brought him into close personal relations with the politicians of his time, and in 1763 he was instrumental in saving John Wilkes, whose partisan he was, from death at the hands of James Dunn, who had determined to kill him. Darly, who described himself as Liveryman and block maker, issued his last caricature in October 1780, and as his shop, No. 39 Strand, was let to a new tenant in the following year, it is to be presumed that he had by that time died, or become incapable of further work.

== The Darlys ==
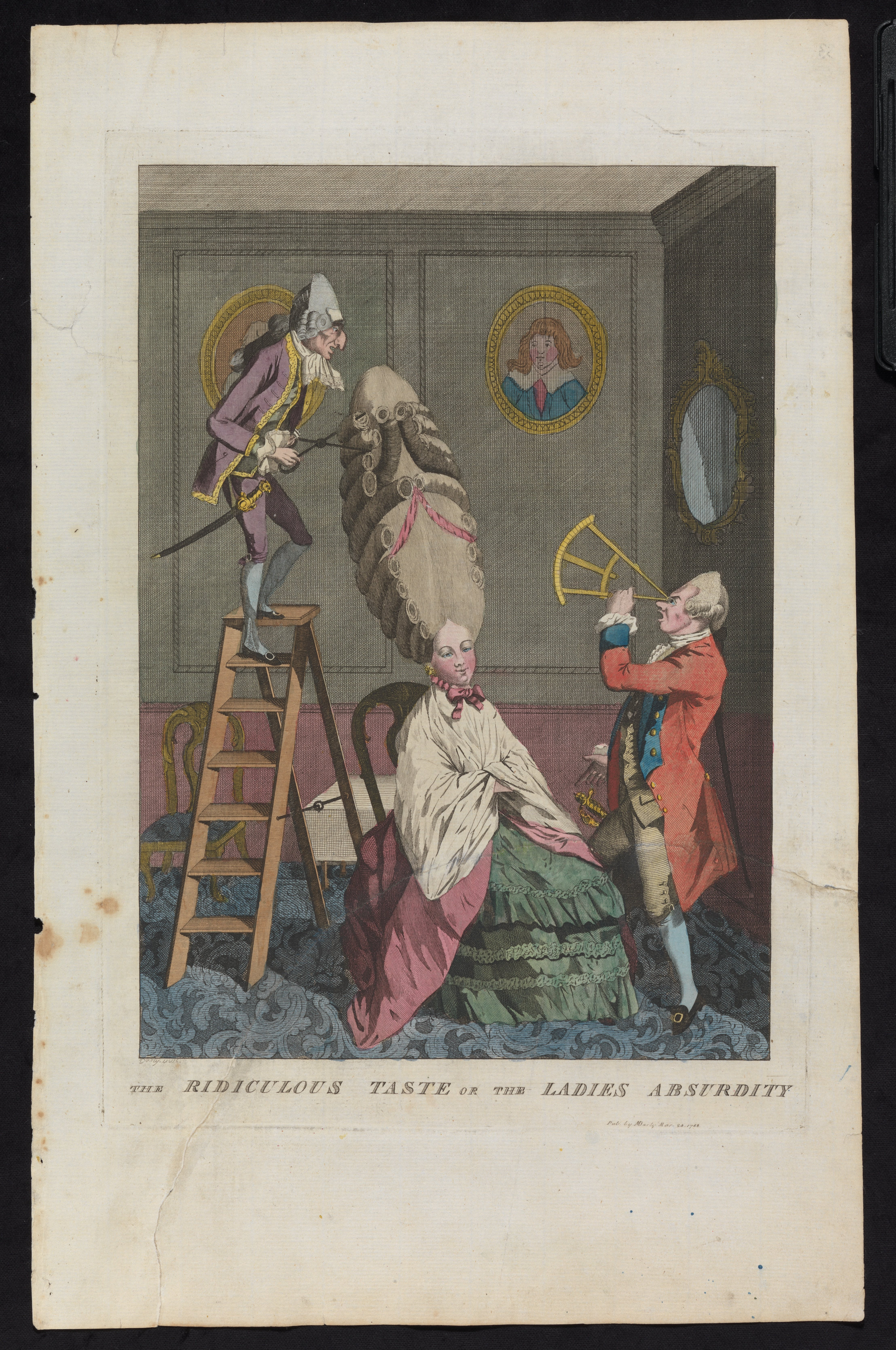
The ridiculous taste or the ladies absurdity. Hand-coloured etching from an album of comic illustrations under the title Darly's Prints of Characters, Caricatures, Macaronies &c., published by Mary and Matthew Darly in London in 1768. Chester Beatty Library

By 1756, the husband-and-wife team had printshops in Fleet Street and the Strand. Mary was the sole manager of the branch at "The Acorn, Ryders Court (Cranbourne Alley), Leicester Fields." Mary advertised in the daily papers in her own name as "etcher and publisher." She was one of the first professional caricaturists in England.

The Darlys' shops, some of the first to specialize in caricature, initially concentrated on political themes in the 1750s, at a time of political crises, but then focused on world of fashion. "They seem to have been shrewd business people, changing their output in response to the fashion of the day." Their etchings and engravings included "Wigs" (12 October 1773), "The Preposterous Head Dress, or the Featherd Lady" (20 March 1776), "Phaetona or Modern Female Taste" (6 November 1776); "Miss Shuttle-Cock" (6 December 1776); and "Oh. Heigh. Oh. Or a View of the Back Settlements" (9 July 1776), a play on words that refers to Ohio Country.

The Darlys also offered drawing lessons to upperclass men and women.

The Darlys relocated their shop from Fleet Street to the West End as the craze for homemade caricatures grew. At their West End shop, they published between 1771 and 1773 six sets of satirical "macaroni" prints, each set containing 24 portraits. The new Darly shop became known as "The Macaroni Print-Shop". Matthew and Mary Darly fueled a rage for caricatures in London, flooding the market with prints on social life, such as those lampooning the so-called "macaronis."

During the 1770s, the Darlys sold a variety of prints at a wide range of prices and to customers from various social classes. Their prints included depictions of prostitutes, market vendors, maidservants, and other women of the age.

They also engraved the drawings of others. The Darlys advertised that "Ladies to whom the fumes of the Aqua Fortis are Noxious may have their Plates carefully Bit, and proved, and may be attended at their own Houses, and have ev’ry necessary instruction in any part of Engraving, Etching, Dry Needle, Metzotinto, etc..."

The Darlys advertised for amateurs to submit sketches for publication. They held an exhibition of amateur prints, such as of "several laughable Subjects, droll Figures, and sundry Characters."

The furniture-makers Ince and Mayhew employed Matthew Darly as an engraver. William Austin was a rival of the Darlys.

The Darlys were responsible for bringing Henry Bunbury's talents as a humorous caricaturist to public attention by publishing his work, and Anthony Pasquin had studied in the earlier part of his career at Matthew Darly’s studio.

There was a small engraved portrait of Mary Darly in the Print Room of the British Museum; it is called "The Female Connoisseur" (February 1772). She is depicted examining a caricature sketch.
