= William Austin (caricaturist) =

English artist, drawing-master, engraver and caricaturist

William Austin (1721 – 11 May 1820, Brighton) was an English artist, drawing-master, engraver and caricaturist. A rival of Matthew Darly, he used a distinctive grainy, woodblock-like style.

== Life and work ==
Austin, was born in London in 1721. He was a pupil of George Bickham, but after having engraved a few plates, chiefly landscapes of no great merit, he relinquished the practice of the art, and devoted the remainder of his life to teaching drawing, first in London and afterwards in Brighton, Sussex. He is recorded in list of eminent painters in the Universal Magazine in 1748.

Among his engravings are four plates of the "Ruins of Ancient Rome" (after Pannini), 4 plates of the "Ruins of Palmyra", 6 "Sea-pieces" (after Van Goyen), and "The Four Times of the Day" (views in Holland after Waterloo, Ruisdael, Van Goyen, and Van der Neer. He likewise engraved with Paul Sandby, Vivares, and others, some views of "Windsor Park" and "Virginia Water", and also published in 1781 a series of thirty plates, slightly etched from drawings by Andrea Locatelli, entitled "A Specimen of Sketching Landscapes".

For some time he ran a print-shop, and published some political caricatures, mostly directed against the French, and in support of the administration of Charles James Fox. Six of these, "French Spies attacked by British Bees", and others, were engraved by himself in 1780. His consistent support for the Whig Interest led him to be known as Fox's Fool.

A trade card in the Heal Collection in the British Museum. advertises "Austin, Etcher & Engraver, At the Golden Head, In great George Street, Hanover Square. Sells all sorts of Italian, Dutch, French and Flemish Prints & Drawings, both of the Antient [sic] & Modern Masters; with the greatest variety of Japanning & Water Colours; Brushes. Black, Red & White Chalk, India Ink, Portcrayons, Black Lead Pencils, Drawing Paper &c. Coats of Arms, Visiting Tickets & Shop-Bills Design'd, Engraved & Printed, Pictures carefully Clean'd, Lin'd & Mended. Most Money for Prints." The British Museum catalogue has over 70 works by Austin.

Austin died in Brighton on 11 May 1820, at the advanced age of ninety-nine. his obituary appears in the Gentleman's Magazine in 1820.
