= Henry Charles Angelo the Younger =

British fencer

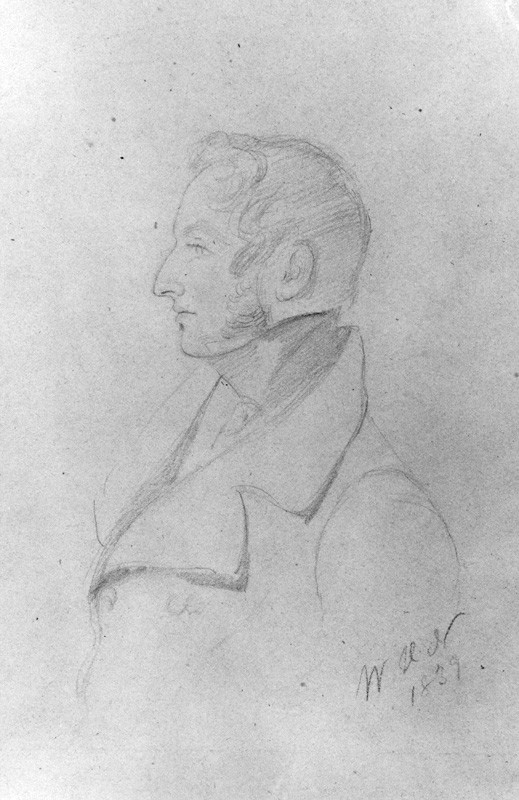
Henry Charles Angelo the Younger in a pencil drawing by W.H. Nightingale, 1839. National Portrait Gallery, London.

Henry Charles Angelo the Younger (1780-1852) was a British master of fencing, part of the Angelo Family of fencers.

== Early life ==
Henry was born in 1780 to Henry Angelo (1756-1835). He was the grandson of Domenico Angelo Malevolti Tremamondo (1716 or 1717 to 1802), the founder of the dynasty.

== Career ==
The younger Henry took over his father's fencing academy in Bond Street from his father in 1817. He subsequently moved it to St. James's Street (1830-1896). He was superintendent of sword exercise to the British Army and the Royal Navy (1833-1852).

== Death ==
Henry died in 1852. He is buried in Kensal Green Cemetery.

== Selected publications ==
- The Infantry Sword Exercise . 1845.
- The Reminiscences of Henry Angelo, 1830
