= Macaroni (fashion) =

Outlandishly fashionable man

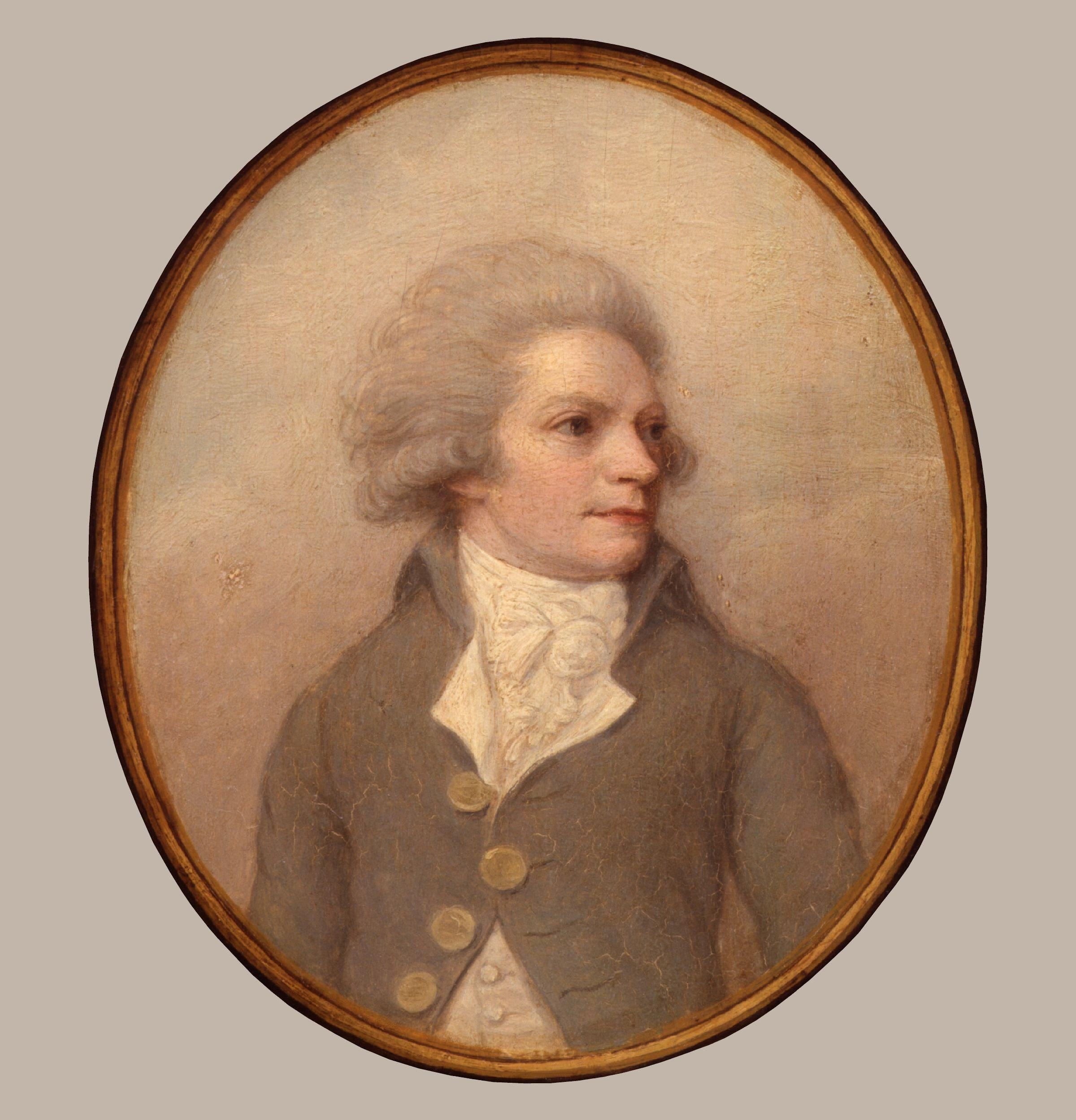
Self portrait of Richard Cosway, a Georgian-era portrait painter, who was known as the "Macaroni Artist"

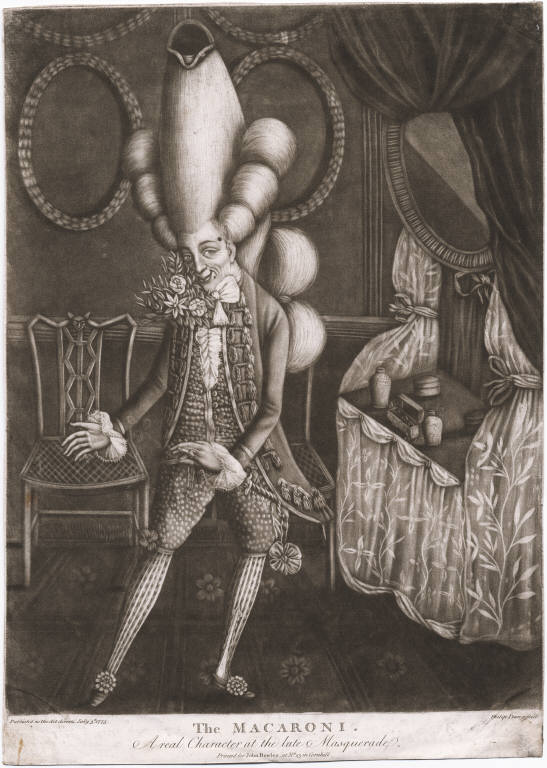
"The Macaroni. A real Character at the late Masquerade", mezzotint by Philip Dawe, 1773

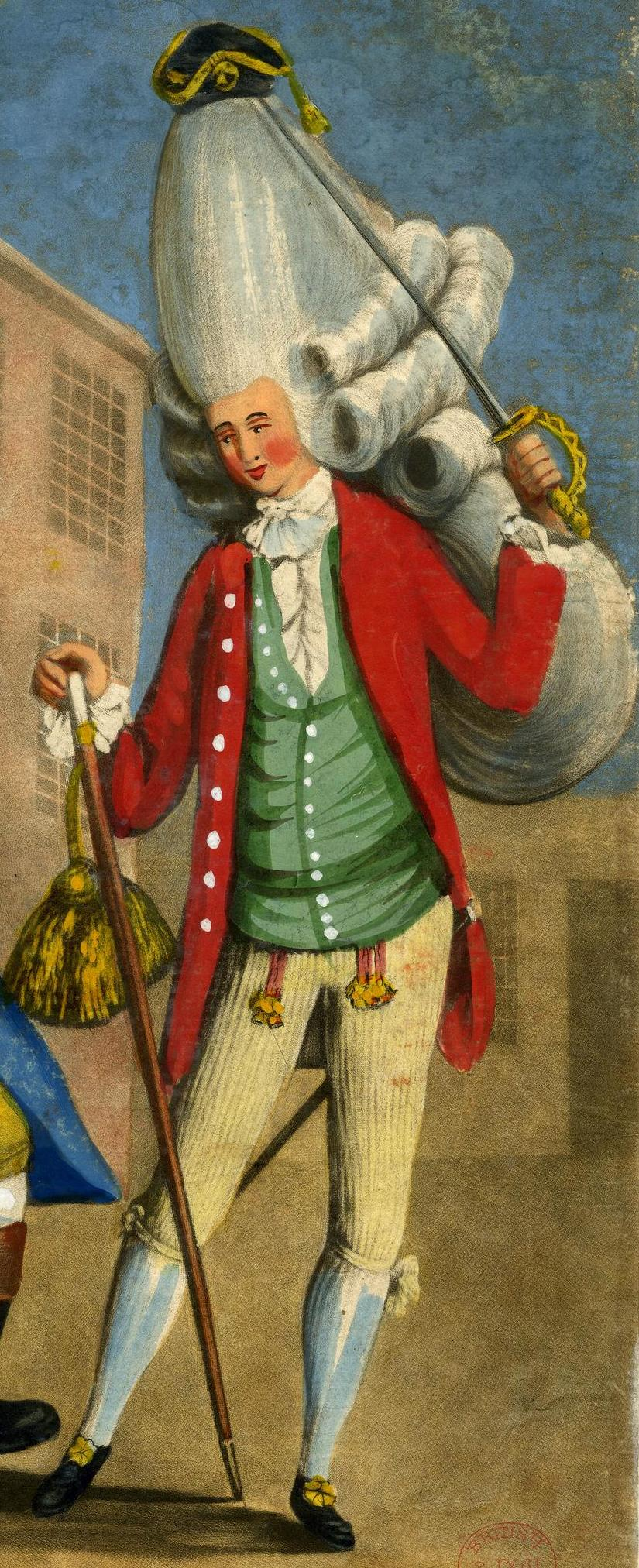
A fop from "What is this my Son Tom?", 1774

"Macaroni" (formerly spelled "maccaroni") was a pejorative term used to describe a fashionable fellow of 18th-century Britain. Stereotypically, men in the macaroni subculture dressed, spoke, and behaved in an androgynous manner. The term "macaroni" pejoratively referred to a man who "exceeded the ordinary bounds of fashion" in terms of high-end clothing, fastidious eating, and gambling. He mixed Continental affectations with his British nature, like a practitioner of macaronic verse (which mixed English and Latin to comic effect), laying himself open to satire.

The macaronis became seen in stereotyped terms in Britain, being seen as a symbol of inappropriate bourgeois excess, effeminacy, and possible homosexuality – which was then legally viewed as sodomy. At the time, homosexuality was frowned upon, and was even punishable by death. Many modern critics view the macaroni as representing a general change in 18th-century British society such as political change, class consciousness, new nationalisms, commodification, and consumer capitalism. The macaroni was the Georgian era precursor to the dandy of the Regency and Victorian eras.

== Origins and etymology ==
In the 18th century, wealthy young British men traditionally took a trip around Europe upon their coming of age, known as the Grand Tour. Italy was a key destination of these tours. During their trip, many developed a taste for maccaroni, a type of pasta little known in Britain then, and so they were said to belong to the Macaroni Club, founded in 1764 by those returning from the Grand Tour. They would refer to anything that was fashionable or à la mode as "very maccaroni".

The Italian term maccherone, when figuratively meaning "blockhead, fool", was apparently not related to this British usage, though both were derived from the name of the pasta shape.

Author Horace Walpole wrote to a friend in 1764 of "the Macaroni Club Almack's, which is composed of all the travelled young men who wear long curls and spying-glasses". The expression was particularly used to characterize "fops" who dressed in high fashion with tall, powdered wigs with a chapeau-bras on top that could only be removed on the point of a sword.

The Macaroni suit, made up of a shorter, tighter fitting coat, colourful stockings, and shoes adorned with large buckles, and, fastened in a large bow, the Macaroni cravat, made from lace-edged muslin, were developed and worn in the 1770s. A prominently large nosegay of flowers was often worn (on the left side of the chest or shoulder of the coat), along with a very small tricorne style hat.

The shop of engravers and printsellers Mary and Matthew Darly in the fashionable West End of London sold their sets of satirical "macaroni" caricature prints, published between 1771 and 1773. The new Darly shop became known as "the Macaroni Print-Shop".

Design historian Peter McNeil links macaroni fashion to the crossdressing of the earlier molly subculture, and says "some macaronis may have utilized aspects of high fashion in order to affect new class identities, but others may have asserted what we would now label a queer identity". (Note: This reading has not been universally accepted; Kevin Murphy and Sally O'Driscoll argue that this implied that both the wearer and the casual observer would have drawn the same interpretation from aspects of macaroni clothing.)

== Examples of usage ==
In 1773, James Boswell was on tour in Scotland with the stout and serious-minded essayist and lexicographer Dr. Samuel Johnson, the least dandified of Londoners. Johnson was awkward in the saddle, and Boswell ribbed him: "You are a delicate Londoner; you are a maccaroni; you can't ride."

There is indeed a kind of animal, neither male nor female, a thing of the neuter gender, lately [1770] started up among us. It is called a macaroni. It talks without meaning, it smiles without pleasantry, it eats without appetite, it rides without exercise, it wenches without passion.

In Oliver Goldsmith's She Stoops to Conquer (1773), a misunderstanding is discovered and young Marlow finds that he has been mistaken; he cries out, "So then, all's out, and I have been damnably imposed on. O, confound my stupid head, I shall be laughed at over the whole town. I shall be stuck up in caricatura in all the print-shops. The Dullissimo Maccaroni. To mistake this house of all others for an inn, and my father's old friend for an innkeeper!"

The song "Yankee Doodle" from the time of the American Revolutionary War mentions a man who "stuck a feather in his hat and called it macaroni". Dr. Richard Shuckburgh was a British surgeon and also the author of the song's lyrics; the joke which he was making was that the Yankees were naive and unsophisticated enough to believe that a feather in the hat was a sufficient mark of a macaroni. Whether or not these were alternative lyrics sung in the British army, they were enthusiastically taken up by the Americans themselves.

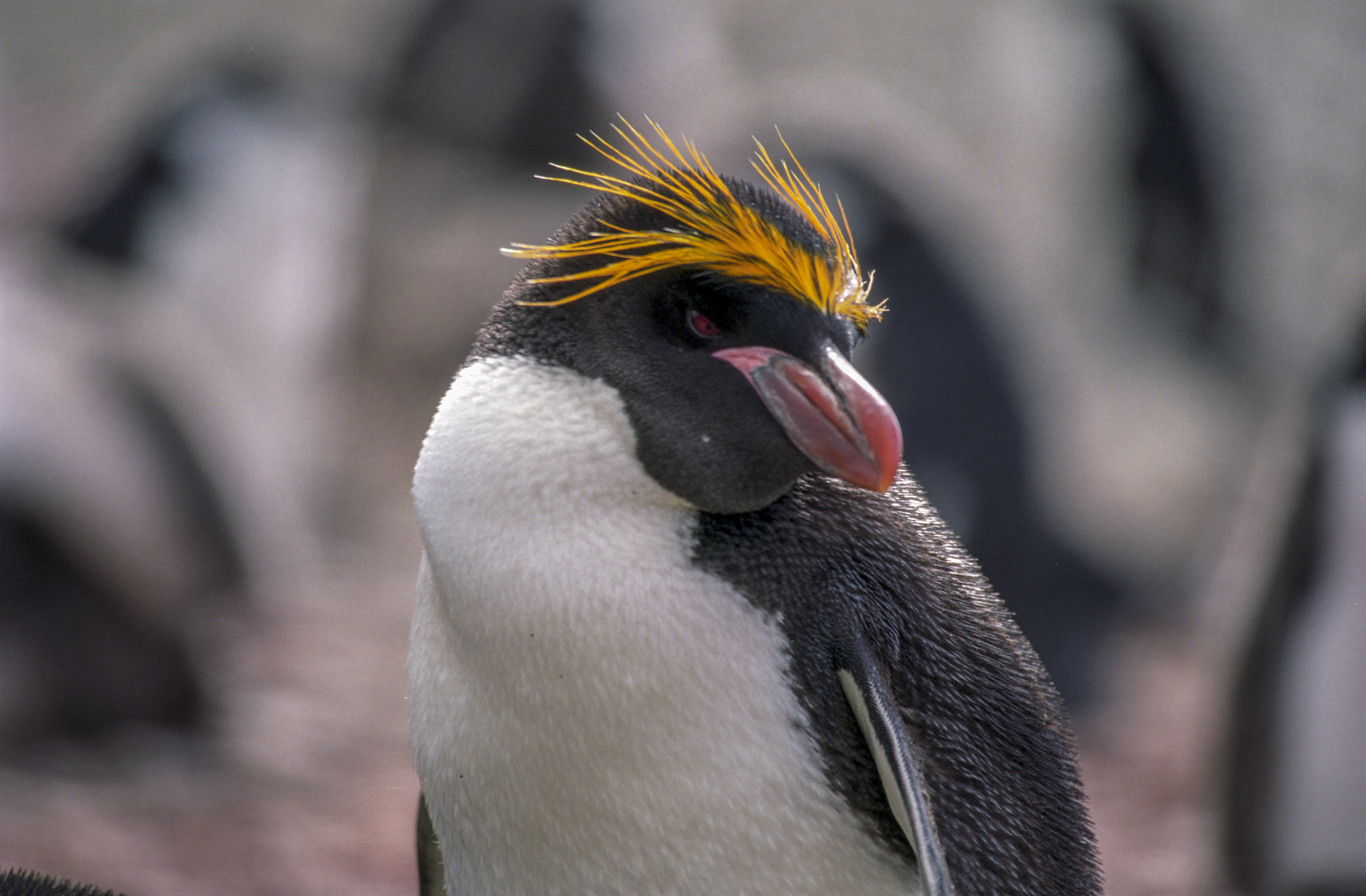
The prominently-crested macaroni penguin

== See also ==
- Dandy
- Incroyables and merveilleuses
- Metrosexual
- Hipster
- Soy boy
