= James Graham (sexologist) =

Scottish medical quack and sex therapist (1745–1794)

James Graham (1745–1794) was a Scottish showman, as well as a proponent of electrical cures, the inventor of earth-bathing, and a pioneer in sex therapy. A self-styled doctor, he was best known for his electro-magnetic musical Grand State Celestial Bed. Dismissed as a quack by medical experts, Graham apparently believed in the efficacy of his unusual treatments.

Historian Roy Porter writing in the Oxford Dictionary of National Biography states that Graham's sexological views were quite typical of the period.

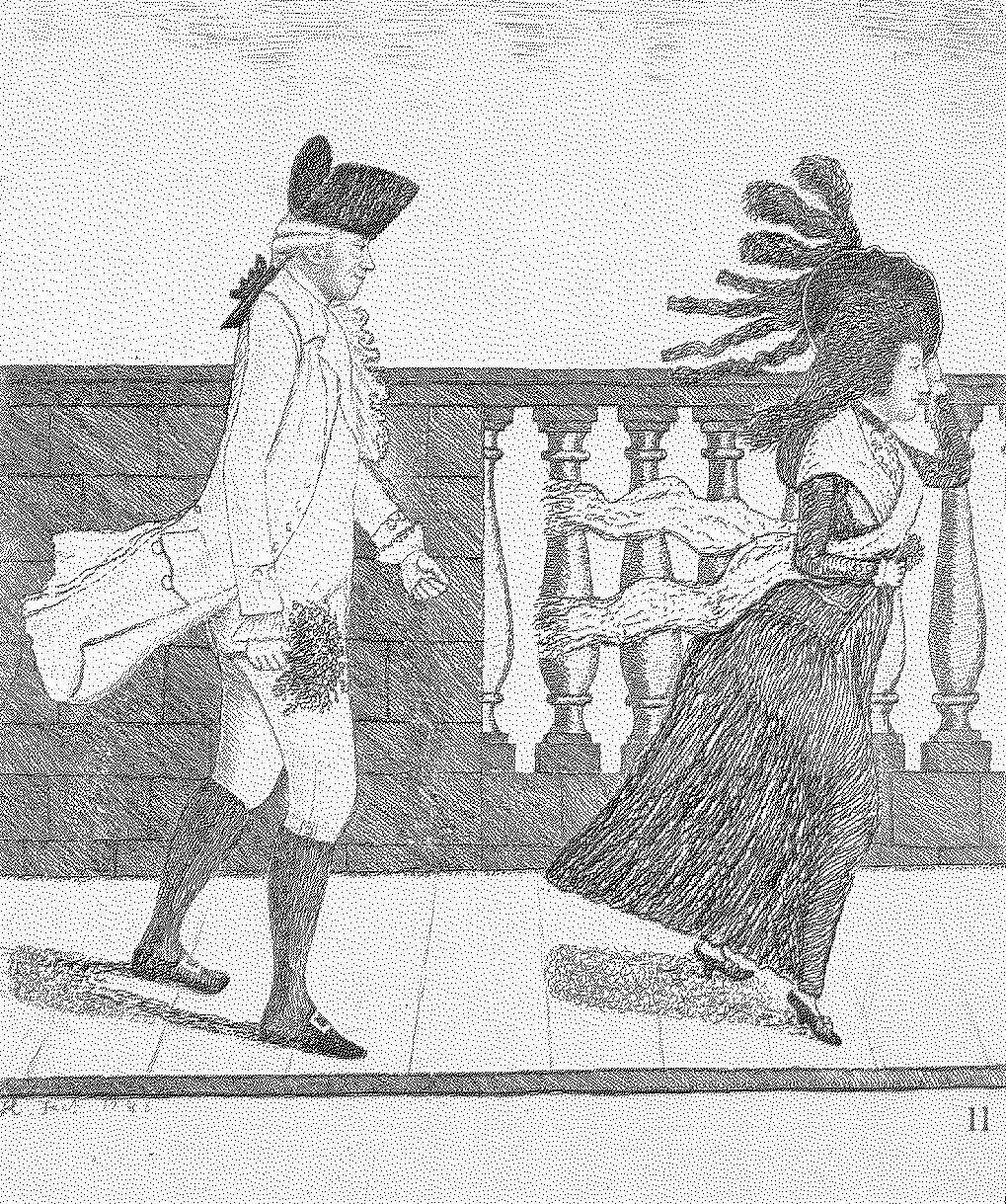
Dr. James Graham going along the North Bridge in a High Wind, caricature portrait from 1785 by John Kay

== Early life ==
James Graham, son of a saddler, was born on 23 June 1745 in Edinburgh, where he trained in medicine, but left medical school without taking a degree. Probably with the help of William Buchan, future author of the best-seller Domestic Medicine, Graham set up as an apothecary in Doncaster, Yorkshire, and in 1764 he married Mary Pickering of Ackworth. They had three children, of whom a son, James, a diplomat, and a daughter survived their father.

In 1770 Graham left England for America, travelling around the middle colonies as an oculist and aurist before settling in Philadelphia. He placed prosthetic eyes and performed cataract surgery. Here he learned the principles of electricity from Ebenezer Kinnersley, Benjamin Franklin's friend and collaborator, and he later wrote that it was in Philadelphia that he began to develop the prototype of his Celestial Bed. Leaving America around the time of the first rumblings of the American Revolution, he worked briefly in Bristol and then Bath before setting up practice in London, where Horace Walpole consulted him about his gout.

After travelling in Holland, Germany and Russia in 1776, Graham set up practice in Bath, Somerset. Advertisements promoting cures using "Effluvia, Vapours and Applications ætherial, magnetic or electric" attracted his first celebrity patient, the historian Catharine Macaulay. She became the subject of scandal in 1778 when she married James Graham’s 21-year-old brother William, who was less than half her age.

== Temple of Health ==
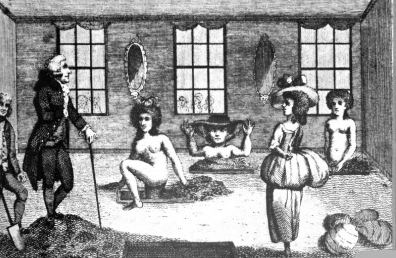
Graham with some of his patients.

During a research tour of Europe in the summer of 1779, Graham acquired a new patron in Lady Spencer, mother of Georgiana, Duchess of Devonshire. In May 1780, Graham opened his first Temple of Health, housed in the centre of the Adam brothers' speculative development at the Adelphi. Here he displayed elaborate electro-magnetic apparatus, treated patients with musical therapy and pneumatic chemistry as well as electricity and magnetism, published marriage guidance material, gave medical lectures and sold medicines such as "Electrical Aether" and "Nervous Aetherial Balsam." He performed with the help of a succession of Goddesses of Health, displayed as models of physical perfection. A later rumour stated that the young Emma Hamilton (then known as Emy Lyon), was employed as the goddess Hebe Vestina. His gigantic porters were nicknamed Gog and Magog, after the Guildhall Giants.

The Temple of Health was a success and Graham became the talk of London, featuring in satirical plays, poems, prints and newspaper skits. During the 1780s he was publicly associated with society figures.

== The Celestial Bed ==
In June 1781 Graham launched the Temple of Hymen in new premises at Schomberg House, in Pall Mall, designed to house the newly built Celestial Bed. His "wonder-working edifice" was 12 by 9 feet (3.7 by 2.7 m), and canopied by a dome covered in musical automata, fresh flowers, and a pair of live turtle doves. Stimulating oriental fragrances and "aethereal" gases were released from a reservoir inside the dome. A tilting inner frame put couples in the best position to conceive, and their movements set off music from organ pipes which breathed out "celestial sounds", whose intensity increased with the ardour of the bed's occupants. The electrified, magnetic creation was insulated by 40 glass pillars. At the head of the bed, above a moving clockwork tableau celebrating Hymen, the god of marriage, and sparkling with electricity, were the words:

"Be fruitful, multiply and replenish the earth!"

At Schomberg House, Graham gave his Lecture on Generation, a frank explanation of how to conceive which saw sex as a patriotic act and procreation as a national duty. Cold water washing of the genitals was recommended as essential to good sexual health, and prostitution and masturbation were castigated. Graham gave more discreet marriage guidance in a pamphlet called "A Private Advice."

Graham was soon in financial difficulties. He vacated the Adelphi Temple of Health in July 1781, and concentrated on trying to recoup his costs at Schomberg House. By March 1784 he was forced to sell most of his possessions. He returned to Edinburgh, to display the remains of his apparatus in a temporary Temple of Health on South Bridge Street.

== Last years ==
Graham developed from the 1770s another therapy, which he called "earth-bathing" in a 1790 pamphlet. In 1786, he gave public exhibitions of earth-bathing in Panton Street in London, and lectured buried up to the neck in earth.

From the mid-1780s Graham preached, and opposed the religious views of Joseph Priestley. At times he was confined to his house as a lunatic.

At the end of 1792, Graham began to experiment with extended fasting to prolong his life. He died at his home in Edinburgh in 1794.

== Publications ==
Graham published his first medical tract in 1775, and continued to promote his ideas in print throughout his life. His publications were distinguished by their flowery and hyperbolical rhetoric, and their humane and progressive views on war, slavery, women’s education, farming, religious tolerance and diet (he was a passionate vegetarian).

== In fiction ==
James Graham is the subject of the novel The Temple of Hymen by Jacqui Lofthouse (London: Penguin Books, 1996). He is also a character in the novel On a Making Tide by David Donachie, and in Deborah Harkness's novel Time's Convert.

== See also ==
- earth-bathing
