= Nick Evangelista =

American fencer (born 1949)

Nick Evangelista (born January 25, 1949) is a fencer, author, and magazine publisher. He teaches the classical French school of fencing in Springfield, Missouri. He was trained by Olympic fencer Ralph Faulkner.

== Works ==
One of the more prolific and outspoken proponents of classical fencing, Evangelista has authored several books, including:

- The Encyclopedia of the Sword (1995); ISBN 0-313-27896-2
- The Art and Science of Fencing (1996); ISBN 1-57028-075-4
- Fighting with Sticks (1998)
- The Inner Game of Fencing (2000); ISBN 1-57028-230-7
- Evangelista, Nick; Evangelista, Anita; Brown, Roberta (Afterword) (September 1, 2001). The Woman Fencer (Paperback) (1st ed.). Terre Haute, Indiana: Wish Publishing. pp. 288. ISBN 1930546483. ISBN 978-1930546486

== See also ==
- Swordsmanship
