= Giampaolo Zennaro =

Italian opera director and stage designer

Giampaolo Zennaro (born October 19, c. 1940) is an Italian Opera director and stage designer.

== Biography ==
Zennaro started working with Teatri Emiliani ATER in 1967, following his apprenticeship with Gianrico Becher. He directed over one hundred operas, including Aida, Traviata, Otello, Rigoletto, La Cenerentola, Don Giovanni, La bohème, Tosca, Turandot, as well as some less performed operas, such as La Fanciulla del West and Guglielmo Ratcliff. His productions have been performed in several Opera houses worldwide. Of particular note at the Teatro Real in Madrid, the Gran Teatre del Liceu in Barcelona, the Sferisterio in Macerata, the Opera Festival in Las Palmas de Gran Canaria, the Festival Puccini in Torre del Lago, the Teatro Carlo Felice in Genova, the Teatro Colón in Buenos Aires.

Zennaro has worked with some of the most well known operatic singers of the 20th century: tenors Mario Del Monaco, Alfredo Kraus, Plácido Domingo, José Carreras, Luciano Pavarotti, baritones Rolando Panerai and Renato Bruson, sopranos Ghena Dimitrova and Montserrat Caballé, as well as with dancers such as the legendary Rudolf Nureyev.

He is married to soprano Elena Baggiore.

Zennaro is a professor at the Complutense University of Madrid.
