= List of accolades received by Bridge of Spies (film) =

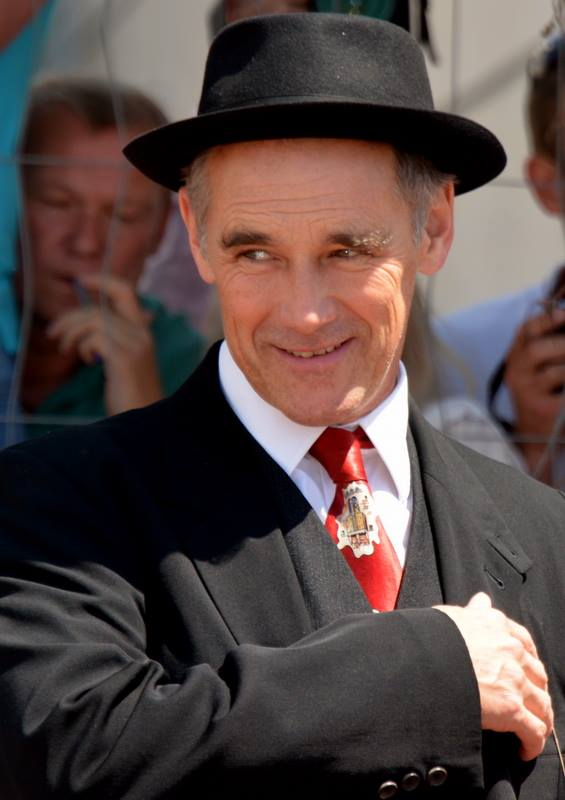
- Mark Rylance received several awards and nominations for his portrayal of Rudolf Abel
Accolades
Award	Won	Nominated
AACTA Awards	1	1
Academy Awards	1	6
Alliance of Women Film Journalists	0	1
American Film Institute	0	1
American Society of Cinematographers	0	1
Art Directors Guild	0	1
Boston Society of Film Critics	1	1
British Academy Film Awards	1	9
Casting Society of America	0	1
Chicago Film Critics Association	0	2
Cinema Audio Society Awards	0	1
Critics' Choice Awards	0	5
Dallas–Fort Worth Film Critics Association	0	1
David di Donatello Awards	1	1
Empire Awards	0	1
Florida Film Critics Circle	0	1
Golden Globes Awards	0	1
Golden Trailer Awards	1	2
Hollywood Film Awards	2	2
Houston Film Critics Society	0	1
London Film Critics' Circle	1	1
Los Angeles Film Critics Association	0	1
Motion Picture Sound Editors	1	1
National Board of Review	1	1
National Society of Film Critics	1	1
New York Film Critics Circle	1	1
New York Film Critics Online	1	1
Online Film Critics Society	0	1
Producers Guild of America Award	0	1
San Diego Film Critics Society	0	1
San Francisco Film Critics Circle	0	2
Satellite Awards	1	5
Saturn Awards	1	1
Screen Actors Guild Awards	0	1
St. Louis Gateway Film Critics Association	0	1
Toronto Film Critics Association	1	1
Vancouver Film Critics Circle	1	1
Visual Effects Society	0	1
Washington D.C. Area Film Critics Association	0	2
Women Film Critics Circle	1	1
Writers Guild of America Award	0	1
- Total number of awards and nominations
Totals	19	67
- References

Bridge of Spies is a 2015 historical legal thriller directed by Steven Spielberg. The screenplay was written by Matt Charman and Joel and Ethan Coen. The film is set during the Cold War and is based on the 1960 U-2 incident and its aftermath. Tom Hanks plays lawyer James B. Donovan who is tasked with negotiating the release of the captured American pilot Francis Gary Powers (Austin Stowell) in exchange for the convicted KGB spy Rudolf Abel (Mark Rylance). Alan Alda, Sebastian Koch, and Amy Ryan feature in supporting roles.

The film premiered at the 53rd New York Film Festival on October 4, 2015. Walt Disney Studios Motion Pictures gave the film a wide release on October 16 at over 2,800 theaters in the United States and Canada. Bridge of Spies grossed a worldwide total of over $165 million on a production budget of $40 million. Rotten Tomatoes, a review aggregator, surveyed 297 reviews and judged 91% to be positive. The film garnered many awards and nominations in a variety of categories with particular praise for Rylance's performance.

Bridge of Spies received six nominations at the 88th Academy Awards, including Best Picture, Best Original Screenplay, and Best Original Score. Rylance went on to win the Academy Award for Best Supporting Actor. At the 69th British Academy Film Awards, the film garnered nine nominations and won Best Supporting Actor for Rylance. He also won the Best Supporting Actor award from the AACTA Awards, New York Film Critics Circle, London Film Critics' Circle, Toronto Film Critics Association, and Vancouver Film Critics Circle. Rylance also received nominations at the Golden Globe Awards and the Screen Actors Guild Awards. Both the American Film Institute and the National Board of Review included Bridge of Spies in their top ten films of 2015.

== Accolades ==
Award	Date of ceremony	Category	Recipient(s)	Result	Ref.
AACTA Awards	December 9, 2015	Best Supporting Actor – International	Mark Rylance	Won	
Academy Awards	February 28, 2016	Best Picture	Kristie Macosko Krieger, Marc Platt, and Steven Spielberg	Nominated	
Academy Awards	February 28, 2016	Best Supporting Actor	Mark Rylance	Won	
Academy Awards	February 28, 2016	Best Original Screenplay	Matt Charman, Joel Coen and Ethan Coen	Nominated	
Academy Awards	February 28, 2016	Best Original Score	Thomas Newman	Nominated	
Academy Awards	February 28, 2016	Best Production Design	Production Design: Adam Stockhausen; Set Decoration: Bernhard Henrich and Rena DeAngelo	Nominated	
Academy Awards	February 28, 2016	Best Sound Mixing	Drew Kunin, Andy Nelson, and Gary Rydstrom	Nominated	
Alliance of Women Film Journalists	January 13, 2016	Best Supporting Actor	Mark Rylance	Nominated	
American Film Institute	December 16, 2015	Top Ten Films of the Year	Bridge of Spies	Won	
American Society of Cinematographers	February 14, 2016	Outstanding Achievement in Cinematography in a Theatrical Release	Janusz Kamiński	Nominated	
Art Directors Guild	January 31, 2016	Excellence in Production Design for a Period Film	Adam Stockhausen	Nominated	
Boston Society of Film Critics	December 6, 2015	Best Supporting Actor	Mark Rylance	Won	
British Academy Film Awards	February 14, 2016	Best Film	Kristie Macosko Krieger, Marc Platt, and Steven Spielberg	Nominated	
British Academy Film Awards	February 14, 2016	Best Actor in a Supporting Role	Mark Rylance	Won	
British Academy Film Awards	February 14, 2016	Best Direction	Steven Spielberg	Nominated	
British Academy Film Awards	February 14, 2016	Best Original Screenplay	Matt Charman, and Joel and Ethan Coen	Nominated	
British Academy Film Awards	February 14, 2016	Best Film Music	Thomas Newman	Nominated	
British Academy Film Awards	February 14, 2016	Best Cinematography	Janusz Kamiński	Nominated	
British Academy Film Awards	February 14, 2016	Best Editing	Michael Kahn	Nominated	
British Academy Film Awards	February 14, 2016	Best Production Design	Adam Stockhausen, Bernhard Henrich, and Rena DeAngelo	Nominated	
British Academy Film Awards	February 14, 2016	Best Sound	Drew Kunin, Richard Hymns, Andy Nelson, and Gary Rydstrom	Nominated	
Casting Society of America	January 21, 2016	Big Budget – Drama	Ellen Lewis, and Kate Sprance	Nominated	
Chicago Film Critics Association	December 16, 2015	Best Original Screenplay	Matt Charman, and Joel and Ethan Coen	Nominated	
Chicago Film Critics Association	December 16, 2015	Best Supporting Actor	Mark Rylance	Nominated	
Cinema Audio Society Awards	February 20, 2016	Outstanding Achievement in Sound Mixing for Motion Picture – Live Action	Bridge of Spies	Nominated	
Critics' Choice Awards	January 17, 2016	Best Picture	Kristie Macosko Krieger, Marc Platt, and Steven Spielberg	Nominated	
Critics' Choice Awards	January 17, 2016	Best Director	Steven Spielberg	Nominated	
Critics' Choice Awards	January 17, 2016	Best Supporting Actor	Mark Rylance	Nominated	
Critics' Choice Awards	January 17, 2016	Best Original Screenplay	Matt Charman, and Joel and Ethan Coen	Nominated	
Critics' Choice Awards	January 17, 2016	Best Art Direction	Adam Stockhausen, and Rena DeAngelo	Nominated	
Dallas–Fort Worth Film Critics Association	December 14, 2015	Best Supporting Actor	Mark Rylance	2nd place	
David di Donatello Awards	April 18, 2016	Best Foreign Film	Bridge of Spies	Won	
Empire Awards	March 20, 2016	Best Thriller	Bridge of Spies	Nominated	
Florida Film Critics Circle	December 23, 2015	Best Supporting Actor	Mark Rylance	Nominated	
Golden Eagle Award	January 27, 2017	Best Foreign Language Film	Bridge of Spies	Nominated	
Golden Globe Awards	January 10, 2016	Best Supporting Actor	Mark Rylance	Nominated	
Golden Trailer Awards	May 4, 2016	Best Drama	"Standing Man"	Nominated	
Golden Trailer Awards	May 4, 2016	Best Drama TV Spot	"Standing Man International"	Won	
Hollywood Film Awards	November 1, 2015	Hollywood Cinematography Award	Janusz Kamiński	Won	
Hollywood Film Awards	November 1, 2015	Hollywood Sound Award	Gary Rydstrom	Won	
Houston Film Critics Society	January 9, 2016	Best Supporting Actor	Mark Rylance	Nominated	
London Film Critics' Circle	January 17, 2016	Supporting Actor of the Year	Mark Rylance	Won	
Los Angeles Film Critics Association	December 6, 2015	Best Supporting Actor	Mark Rylance	Runner-up	
Motion Picture Sound Editors	February 27, 2016	Best Sound Editing: Feature English Language – Dialogue/ADR	Richard Hymns, Gary Rydstrom, Brian Chumney, and Steve Slanec	Won	
National Board of Review	December 1, 2015	Top Ten Films	Bridge of Spies	Won	
National Society of Film Critics	January 3, 2016	Best Supporting Actor	Mark Rylance	Won	
New York Film Critics Circle	December 2, 2015	Best Supporting Actor	Mark Rylance	Won	
New York Film Critics Online	December 6, 2015	Best Supporting Actor	Mark Rylance	Won	
Online Film Critics Society	December 13, 2015	Best Supporting Actor	Mark Rylance	Nominated	
Producers Guild of America Award	January 23, 2016	Outstanding Producer of Theatrical Motion Pictures	Kristie Macosko Krieger, Marc Platt, and Steven Spielberg	Nominated	
San Diego Film Critics Society	December 14, 2015	Best Supporting Actor	Mark Rylance	Nominated	
San Francisco Film Critics Circle	December 13, 2015	Best Supporting Actor	Mark Rylance	Nominated	
San Francisco Film Critics Circle	December 13, 2015	Best Production Design	Adam Stockhausen, Rena DeAngelo, and Bernhard Henrich	Nominated	
Satellite Awards	February 21, 2016	Best Film	Kristie Macosko Krieger, Marc Platt, and Steven Spielberg	Nominated	
Satellite Awards	February 21, 2016	Best Director	Steven Spielberg	Nominated	
Satellite Awards	February 21, 2016	Best Original Screenplay	Matt Charman, and Joel and Ethan Coen	Nominated	
Satellite Awards	February 21, 2016	Best Art Direction and Production Design	Adam Stockhausen, Bernhard Henrich, and Rena DeAngelo	Won	
Satellite Awards	February 21, 2016	Best Film Editing	Michael Kahn	Nominated	
Saturn Award	June 22, 2016	Best Thriller Film	Bridge of Spies	Won	
Screen Actors Guild Awards	January 30, 2016	Outstanding Performance by a Male Actor in a Supporting Role	Mark Rylance	Nominated	
St. Louis Gateway Film Critics Association	December 21, 2015	Best Supporting Actor	Mark Rylance	Nominated	
Toronto Film Critics Association	December 14, 2015	Best Supporting Actor	Mark Rylance	Won	
Vancouver Film Critics Circle	December 21, 2015	Best Supporting Actor	Mark Rylance	Won	
Visual Effects Society	February 2, 2016	Outstanding Supporting Visual Effects in a Photoreal Feature	Bridge of Spies	Nominated	
Writers Guild of America Award	February 13, 2016	Best Original Screenplay	Matt Charman, Joel and Ethan Coen	Nominated	

== See also ==
- 2015 in film
