= Milan C. Miskovsky =

American CIA member

- Born: May 11, 1926; Chicago, Illinois, US
- Died: October 15, 2009 (aged 83); Washington, D.C., US
- Spouse: Anne Miskovsky (m. 1952; died 2004)
- Military career
- Allegiance: United States

Milan Carl Miskovsky (May 11, 1926 – October 15, 2009) was an American who served as a member of the Central Intelligence Agency (CIA). He helped negotiate the release of Gary Powers in 1962 and over 1,000 prisoners captured during the 1961 Bay of Pigs Invasion. After retiring from the CIA, Miskovsky worked for multiple federal agencies, including the Federal Maritime Commission and the Treasury Department.

Following the 1967 Detroit riot, Miskovsky was appointed to lead an investigation into the cause of the unrest and interview civil rights leaders for the Kerner Commission. His report ultimately concluded that America was becoming divided into two separate societies based on skin color, and that the societies were inherently unequal.

Miskovsky would later serve as the director of the Lawyers' Committee for Civil Rights Under Law and the general counsel of the Federal Home Loan Bank Board. He helped to establish the Archdiocesan Legal Network in 1989 and worked in private practice from 1981 until his retirement in 2003.

== Early life ==
Miskovsky was born on May 11, 1926, in Chicago, Illinois, the son of Jaroslav Miškovský, an immigrant from Czechoslovakia, and Ruth Miškovský (nee Patera). He grew up during the Great Depression, but his family did not suffer significant economic harm. Miskovsky's father was heavily involved in Chicago politics, and Miskovsky would frequently help him deliver food and clothes to people unable to afford them.

He graduated from the University of Michigan in 1949 and worked for the U.S. Forest Service for the next two years. He was reassigned to Washington, D.C., in 1951, where he was hired by the CIA to investigate forests of the Eastern Bloc. In 1956, Miskovsky obtained a law degree from the George Washington University Law School. He joined the legal office of the CIA, and was eventually promoted to the rank of assistant general counsel.

== U-2 incident ==
In 1960, the Soviet Union shot down a United States U-2 spy plane. The Soviets captured its pilot, Gary Powers, and tried him for committing espionage against the Soviet Union. At first, the United States believed that Powers could be freed by crafting an argument regarding international principles. To this end, Miskovsky and two other lawyers (Alexander W. Parker and Frank Rogers) wrote a brief stating that Power's U-2 plane did not violate Soviet airspace any more than Sputnik violated American airspace. However, the Soviet Union refused to allow foreigners to defend Powers. Powers was ultimately defended by a lawyer who acted as a spokesman for the Soviet government.

The Soviets ultimately sentenced Powers to a decade in prison. Working with lawyer James B. Donovan, Miskovsky negotiated with Soviet representatives. Eventually, they agreed upon a trade: Gary Powers would be released in exchange for Soviet spy Rudolf Abel held by the United States. Both sides agreed and Powers was released in 1962, along with Frederic Pryor, an American economics student imprisoned in East Germany.

== Bay of Pigs invasion ==
In April 1961, a 1,400-man force of Cuban exiles invaded Cuba in an attempt to end the regime of Fidel Castro. The invasion was a failure and two hundred of the exiles were killed while an additional 1,200 were captured. Miskovsky, working with lawyer and lead negotiator James Donovan, and Attorney General Robert F. Kennedy, negotiated a release for the prisoners in return for around fifty million dollars in medicine, food and other supplies. The captured Cubans were released days before Christmas 1962.

== Later life ==
Miskovsky left the CIA in 1964, and worked for the Federal Maritime Commission and the Treasury Department for four years. In 1967, Miskovsky was appointed to lead an investigation concerning the 1967 Detroit riot for the Kerner Commission. During the investigation, Miskovsky interviewed civil rights leaders such as Martin Luther King Jr. Miskovsky's report concluded that the United States was transitioning into two separate societies, one black and the other white, and that the societies were inherently unequal. In 1968, Miskovsky was appointed the director of Lawyers' Committee for Civil Rights Under Law, an organization which gave legal aid to those whose civil liberties were violated. From 1977 to 1981, during the administration of President Jimmy Carter, Miskovsky served as general counsel for the Federal Home Loan Bank Board.

From 1981 until his retirement in 2003, Miskovsky worked for Kirkland & Ellis, where he specialized in environmental law. In 1989, Miskovsky helped establish the Archdiocesan Legal Network, a free legal clinic run by the Roman Catholic Archdiocese of Washington. The clinic aided people with non-criminal legal issues such as bankruptcy, evictions, suspended licenses or delayed social security checks. Miskovsky was originally tasked with recruiting other lawyers for the clinic, but was eventually promoted to chairmen of the clinic's board.

Miskovsky died of lung cancer on October 15, 2009, in Washington, D.C.

== Personal life ==
Miskovsky married Anne Miskovsky (nee Grogan), a fellow member of the Central Intelligence Agency, in 1952. The marriage lasted until 2004, when Anne Miskovsky died of leukemia.

Miskovsky was a member of the Holy Trinity Catholic Church in Georgetown. In 1987, he and his wife served as the chairs of the Holy Trinity Parish bicentennial celebration.

== In popular culture ==
When interviewed by the Harvard Gazette in 2016, Donovan's granddaughter Beth Amorosi described as "artistic license" the portrayal in the movie Bridge of Spies of Donovan's rather antagonistic relationship with his CIA handler ("an amalgam" of several CIA people), whereas Donovan "actually had a very good relationship with the CIA agent he worked with, M.C. Miskovsky".

== Publications ==
- Miskovsky, Milan; Van Hook, Matthew (1976). "Regulation of Forestry Related Nonpoint Source Pollution Under the Federal Water Pollution Control Act Amendments of 1972". Natural Resources Lawyer. 9 (4): 645–671. JSTOR 40922454.
- Frank, M.; Miller, David; Miskovsky, Milan; Adams, Charles (1979). "Forest Resources Committee". Natural Resources Lawyer. 12 (1): 105–109. JSTOR 40922548.
- Miskovsky, Milan; Griffith, Janice; Fleming, Joseph (1983). "Recent Developments in Urban Environment Law: Committee on Urban Development". The Urban Lawyer. 15 (4): 977–984. JSTOR 27893222.
