= Matt Charman =

British writer and producer

- Born: 5 June 1979 (age 47); West Sussex, England
- Education: University College London
- Occupations: Screenwriter, playwright, producer
- Writing career
- Years active: 2004–present

Matthew Charman (born 5 June 1979) is a British screenwriter, playwright, and producer. He was nominated for an Academy Award for Best Original Screenplay for his 2015 film Bridge of Spies, directed by Steven Spielberg and co-written with Joel and Ethan Coen. Charman started out writing for theatre, making a breakthrough as writer-in-residence at the National Theatre in London, where then-director Nicholas Hytner described Charman as having "a priceless nose for a story".

== Early life and education ==
Charman was born and raised around the location of Horsham, West Sussex, England, and his family were from Great House Farm in Southwater, where his father's side of the family had lived for 180 years. The family moved to the hamlet of Dragon's Green when Charman was 4 years old. Charman attended junior school in Southwater, getting involved in school plays from a young age. Charman continued his interest in drama at comprehensive secondary school at Forest School, Horsham, getting involved with rehearsals and with stage and lighting equipment. He was involved with the performances of The King and I and My Fair Lady whilst a student of Forest School, Horsham.

Charman studied English literature at University College London. While a student, he frequently sneaked into plays and musicals for free during intervals (a practice known as second-acting), and "tried to figure out what happened in the first act". In the mid-2000s, Charman did uncredited script work for Roland Emmerich's films 2012 and 10,000 BC.

== Career ==
=== Plays ===
Charman's first play, A Night at the Dogs, won the 2004 Verity Bargate Award for emerging writers and appeared at Soho Theatre. He went on to write The Five Wives of Maurice Pinder (2007) and The Observer (2009), about a UN election observer's intervention in a West African nation's political crisis. Both were produced and staged at the National Theatre. In 2012, Charman's play Regrets, directed by Carolyn Cantor and starring Ansel Elgort opened at the Manhattan Theatre Club in New York. Set in McCarthy-era America, the play follows four men in a Nevada desert boarding house waiting out the six weeks required for a no-fault divorce. The Machine, directed by Josie Rourke, opened at the Manchester International Festival in 2013 and then transferred to the Park Avenue Armory in New York. The play told the story of Garry Kasparov's defeat to IBM’s chess computer Deep Blue in 1997, the first time a computer beat a reigning chess world champion under tournament conditions.

Future theatre projects for Charman include an adaptation of Good Night, and Good Luck for the stage, and a play for Nicholas Hytner's new London Theatre Company.

=== Television ===
Charman’s first television work was Our Zoo (2014) for the BBC, which tells the story of the founding of Chester Zoo, famous for having no bars. In 2015, Charman created the three-part police drama Black Work, starring Sheridan Smith, which aired on ITV and was the channel's biggest new drama of the year. In 2017, he wrote a pilot Oasis for Amazon Prime Video, based on a novel The Book of Strange New Things by Michel Faber. The pilot was premiered on 17 March 2017 as a part of pilot season wave 8 by the streamer, however the pilot was not picked up to the series.

He also created Treason (2022) and Hostage (2025) for Netflix. In 2026, he created Prisoner for Sky which was renewed for a second series.

His upcoming television work includes Dirty for Amazon Prime Video starring Phoebe Dynevor and Samantha Morton.

=== Films ===
==== Writing ====
Charman's first feature was Suite Française (2014) co-written with director Saul Dibb, starring Michelle Williams, Kristin Scott Thomas and Margot Robbie. His 2015 feature, Bridge of Spies, was directed by Steven Spielberg, co-written by Charman and Joel and Ethan Coen and starred Tom Hanks, Mark Rylance, and Amy Ryan. Set in Brooklyn and Berlin, the film tells the story of James B. Donovan, an American lawyer who in 1962 negotiated the exchange of Soviet spy Rudolf Abel for the captured pilot of a downed U-2 spy plane, Francis Gary Powers, and American student Frederic Pryor. The film was critically acclaimed, with the New York Times calling it “a consummate entertainment that sweeps you up with pure cinema.” Charman's script was nominated for Best Original Screenplay at both the 2016 Academy Awards and BAFTA Awards. He was also nominated for a WGA award and Critics' Choice award in the same category. Bridge of Spies was a box office hit, grossing $165.5 million worldwide and receiving six Academy Award nominations including Best Picture and Best Original Screenplay, winning Best Supporting Actor for Mark Rylance's performance as Rudolf Abel.

In 2024, he co-wrote the screenplay of Killer Heat (Amazon Prime Video) with Roberto Bentivegna. The movie is based on a short story The Jealousy Man by Jo Nesbø.

==== Producing ====
Charman runs his own production company, Binocular, which is based in London. He was an executive producer on Operation Finale (2018), written by Matthew Orton, about the hunt for Adolf Eichmann. The film was directed by Chris Weitz.

==== Directing ====
Charman's intended directorial feature debut, The Mothership which he also wrote, was shelved by Netflix.

== Awards and honours ==
- 2004 – Verity Bargate Award for his debut play A Night at the Dogs
- 2005 – Attachment at the Soho Theatre
- 2005 – Peggy Ramsay Award
- 2006 – Attachment to the Royal National Theatre Studio
- 2008 – Pearson Writer in Residence at the National Theatre
- 2009 – Catherine Johnson Award for The Observer
- 2016 – Nominated for the Academy Award for Best Original Screenplay

== See also ==
- List of British playwrights since 1950
