= Bridge of Spies (film) =

2015 film by Steven Spielberg

- Theatrical release poster
- Directed by: Steven Spielberg
- Written by: Matt Charman; Ethan Coen Joel Coen
- Produced by: Marc Platt; Steven Spielberg; Kristie Macosko Krieger
- Starring: Tom Hanks; Mark Rylance; Amy Ryan; Alan Alda
- Cinematography: Janusz Kamiński
- Edited by: Michael Kahn
- Music by: Thomas Newman
- Production companies: DreamWorks Pictures; Fox 2000 Pictures; Reliance Entertainment; Participant Media; Afterworks Limited; Studio Babelsberg; Amblin Entertainment; Marc Platt Productions
- Distributed by: Walt Disney Studios Motion Pictures (Note: Distributed by Walt Disney Studios Motion Pictures through the Touchstone Pictures banner.) (United States/Canada); 20th Century Fox (International)
- Release dates: October 4, 2015 (New York Film Festival); October 16, 2015 (United States); November 26, 2015 (Germany); November 27, 2015 (United Kingdom)
- Running time: 141 minutes
- Countries: United States; India; Germany; United Kingdom
- Languages: English; German; Russian
- Budget: $40 million
- Box office: $165.5 million

Bridge of Spies is a 2015 historical drama film directed and co-produced by Steven Spielberg, written by Matt Charman and the Coen brothers, and starring Tom Hanks in the lead role, Mark Rylance, Amy Ryan, and Alan Alda. Set during the Cold War, the film tells the story of lawyer James B. Donovan, who is entrusted with negotiating the release of Francis Gary Powers—a convicted Central Intelligence Agency pilot whose U-2 spy plane was shot down over the Soviet Union in 1960—in exchange for Rudolf Abel, a convicted Soviet KGB spy held by the United States, whom Donovan represented at trial. The name of the film refers to the Glienicke Bridge, which connects Potsdam with Berlin, where the prisoner exchange took place. The film was an international co-production of the United States, India, Germany and the United Kingdom.

Bridge of Spies was shot under the working title of St. James Place. Principal photography began on September 8, 2014, in Brooklyn, New York City, and the production proceeded at Babelsberg Studios in Potsdam. The film was distributed by Walt Disney Studios Motion Pictures through the Touchstone Pictures label on October 16, 2015, in the United States and Canada and by 20th Century Fox in other countries. It received critical acclaim for its screenplay, the performances of Hanks and Rylance, Spielberg's direction, Thomas Newman's musical score, and the production values.

The film was a box office success, grossing $165 million worldwide on a $40 million budget, and received six Academy Award nominations including Best Picture and Best Original Screenplay, and won Best Supporting Actor for Rylance.

== Plot ==
In 1957 New York City, Rudolf Abel is arrested and charged with spying for the Soviet Union. Lawyer James B. Donovan, formerly general counsel to the Office of Strategic Services but now in private practice in insurance law, is appointed to be Abel's legal counsel. Committed to the principle that the accused deserves a vigorous defense, he mounts the best defense of Abel he can, declining along the way to cooperate in the attempts of the Central Intelligence Agency (the successor to his former employer, the OSS) to induce him to violate the confidentiality of his communications with his client.

Abel is convicted, but Donovan convinces the judge to spare him the death penalty because he had been serving his country honorably, and he might prove useful for a future prisoner exchange; Abel is sentenced to 30 years. Donovan appeals the conviction to the Supreme Court based on the lack of a search warrant for the seizure of Abel's ciphers and photography equipment. For his principled stand, Donovan and his family are harassed, including shots being fired at their home. The conviction is upheld in a very close margin.

In 1960, Francis Gary Powers, a pilot in the CIA's top-secret U-2 spy plane program, is shot down over the USSR. He is captured and sentenced to ten years' confinement, including three years in prison.

Donovan receives a letter from East Germany, purportedly sent by Abel's wife, thanking him and urging him to get in contact with their lawyer, whose name is Vogel. The CIA thinks this is a back-channel message hinting that the USSR is willing to swap Powers for Abel. They unofficially ask Donovan to go to Berlin to negotiate the exchange; he arrives just as the Berlin Wall is going up. Crossing into East Berlin, he meets with a KGB officer in the Soviet Embassy and is then directed to Vogel, who represents the Attorney General of the German Democratic Republic (East Germany). The Attorney General seeks to swap Abel for an American graduate student named Frederic Pryor, who had been arrested in East Germany; in the process, the GDR hopes to gain official recognition by the United States.

The CIA wants Donovan to disregard Pryor, but he insists that both Pryor and Powers be swapped for Abel. In a message to the Attorney General, he bluffs that they will either release Pryor with Powers or there will be no deal. The exchange of Powers and Abel is to take place at the Glienicke Bridge, with Pryor to be released simultaneously at Checkpoint Charlie. Tension builds as Pryor fails to arrive. The CIA, still primarily concerned with Powers, tell Abel he can go, but Abel, out of respect for Donovan's dedication to both his own case and securing Pryor's release, refuses to move. It is confirmed that Pryor has been released, and the exchange takes place.

The next day, back in the United States, the government publicly acknowledges Donovan for negotiating the deal, rehabilitating his public image. The closing text reveals Abel was reunited with his wife and daughter, that he was never "publicly acknowledged" as a Soviet Union spy, and that Donovan was asked by President John F. Kennedy to undertake further negotiations on behalf of the United States.

== Cast ==
- Tom Hanks as James B. Donovan
- Mark Rylance as Rudolf Abel
- Scott Shepherd as Hoffman
- Amy Ryan as Mary McKenna Donovan, James's wife
- Sebastian Koch as Wolfgang Vogel
- Alan Alda as Thomas Watters Jr.
- Austin Stowell as Francis Gary Powers
- Billy Magnussen as Doug Forrester
- Eve Hewson as Carol Donovan, James and Mary's first daughter
- Jesse Plemons as Joe Murphy
- Michael Gaston as Agent Williams
- Peter McRobbie as Allen Dulles
- Domenick Lombardozzi as Agent Blasco
- Noah Schnapp as Roger Donovan, James and Mary's son
- Jillian Lebling as Peggy Donovan, James and Mary's second daughter
- Will Rogers as Frederic Pryor
- Dakin Matthews as Judge Mortimer W. Byers
- Burghart Klaußner as Harald Ott
- Mikhail Gorevoy as Ivan Schischkin
- Stephen Kunken as William F. Tompkins

== Production ==
=== Development ===
Bridge of Spies is an American-Indian-German-British co-production based on a script written by Matt Charman and the Coen brothers. Studio Babelsberg co-produced and oversaw production services for the film. James Donovan wrote an account of the incident in 1964 under the title Strangers on a Bridge: The Case of Colonel Abel and Francis Gary Powers. The historical background to the U-2 incident and the story of former West Berlin CIA chief William King Harvey and Operation Gold was published in Rory MacLean's Berlin: Portrait of a City Through the Centuries (2014). Soviet intelligence officer Rudolf Abel, who lived and operated in Brooklyn Heights, did dead drops of stolen documents in Prospect Park. His arrest and history were discussed by Truman Capote, another Heights resident at the time, in his book A House on the Heights.

Charman became interested in Donovan's story after reading a footnote about him in An Unfinished Life: John F. Kennedy, 1917–1963. After meeting with Donovan's son in New York City, Charman pitched the story to several studios and DreamWorks bought it. Studio co-founder Steven Spielberg became interested in the script, and decided to direct the film, because his own father traveled to Moscow on a business trip at the time and saw and photographed the wreckage of Powers's plane on public display. Marc Platt and Kristie Macosko Krieger attached themselves as producers along with Spielberg. Joel and Ethan Coen revised Charman's original script. According to Charman, the brothers "were able to really punch up the negotiations on the back end of the movie, then they handed the baton back to me to do a pass after they did their pass, to make the movie just sit in a place we all wanted it to. The flavor they brought is so fun and enjoyable. It needed to be entertaining but truthful."

In May 2014, it was announced that Tom Hanks would star as James Donovan, with Mark Rylance co-starring as Abel; Rylance had previously been offered a role in Spielberg's 1987 war film Empire of the Sun, but he declined. Rylance considered the Coen brothers' revisions to the screenplay to have substantially improved his part, stating that "[l]ooking at the two versions, it was like looking at the first and second quartos of Hamlet." Amy Ryan, Alan Alda, Billy Magnussen, and Eve Hewson were reported to star in the film as well. Participant Media co-produced the film. Francis Gary Powers Jr., founder of The Cold War Museum and the pilot's son, was brought on as a technical consultant and has a cameo in the film.

In June 2014, Fox 2000 Pictures agreed to co-finance the film with DreamWorks and Participant Media, with the film's distribution rights being divided between Disney and Fox. During a March 3, 2015, interview with The Daily Pennsylvanian, Platt revealed the title to be Bridge of Spies; it was shot under the working title of St. James Place. The film also received funds of €3.7 million, from the German Federal Film Fund (DFFF).

=== Filming ===
Principal photography began on September 8, 2014, in Brooklyn, New York City. On September 14, filming took place in Dumbo, a Brooklyn neighborhood, where crews transformed Anchorage Street to appear as it did in the 1960s. On September 15, filming took place in Astoria, between Astoria Park and Ditmars Boulevard. Filming was done on 18 Street and 26 Avenue in Astoria, where Spielberg was spotted transforming the 5 Corners Deli into a 1950s grocery store. On September 26, filming took place on 44th Street in Manhattan, as evidenced by crews stationed on 44th Street, between Madison and 6th Avenues. On September 27, Hanks was spotted filming scenes on Wall Street among extras wearing 1960s costumes. On September 28, filming of some day and night scenes took place on the corner of Henry Street and Love Lane in the Brooklyn Heights neighborhood of Brooklyn, where the block was set with vintage cars, street signs, rain machines, and spotlights. On September 29, filming took place on Hicks Street and Pineapple Street, where a shop, Perfect Paws, was transformed into a 1960s dress shop named Brooklyn Pearl, and at the New York State Appellate Division courthouse on Monroe Place and Pierrepont Street. On October 6, Hanks and the crew were spotted on the same location on Hicks Street. The scene in the court hallway in which Donovan, to Watters' consternation, announces his intention to appeal the guilty verdict, was filmed on the first floor on the Queens County Supreme Courthouse at 88–11 Sutphin Blvd., Jamaica, New York.

In early October, after filming wrapped in New York City, further production began at Babelsberg Studios in Berlin and Potsdam, Germany, and would continue there through the end of November. Filming in Berlin began with shooting at the former Tempelhof Airport in October, for scenes that actually took place there, such as Donovan's descending from a historic C-54 Skymaster. The prisoner exchange scene was filmed on the Glienicke Bridge (the so-called "Bridge of Spies"), where the historical exchange actually took place in 1962. The bridge spans the Havel narrows between Berlin and Potsdam, and was closed to traffic for filming over the last weekend of November. Then German Chancellor Angela Merkel and former president Bill Clinton visited the set to watch the filming of these scenes. Other filming locations included Berlin-Hohenschönhausen Memorial and Marquardt Palace. In the second half of November, filming moved to Wrocław, Poland, which doubled for East Berlin in sequences showing the construction of the Berlin Wall. Principal photography officially ended on December 4, back at Berlin Tempelhof. During mid-December, filming took place at Beale Air Force Base, located near Marysville, California. The film was shot on 35mm motion picture film, including Kodak Vision3 250D color negative film 5207 and Vision3 500T color negative film 5219.

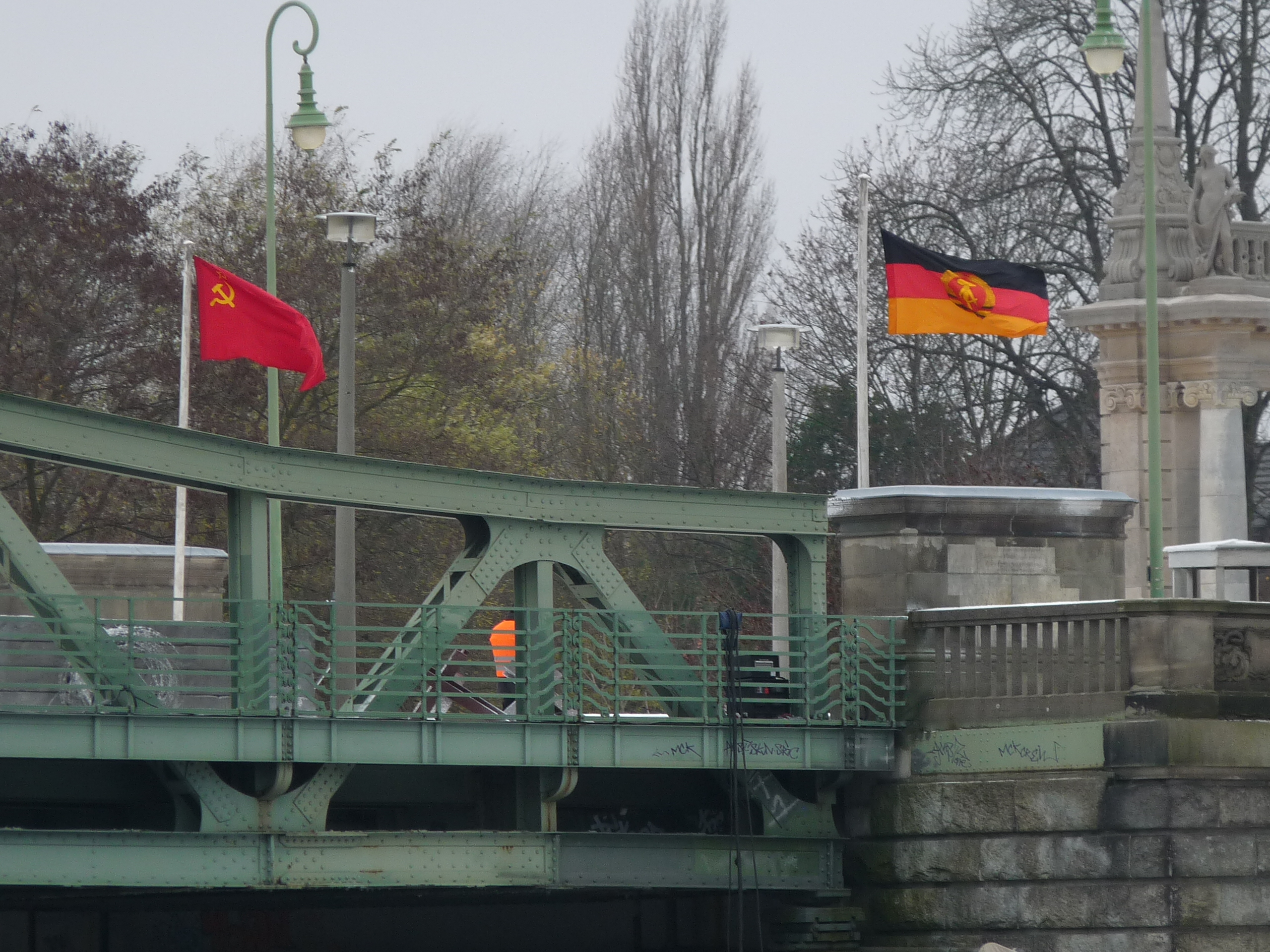
Glienicke Bridge in Potsdam/Berlin during filming

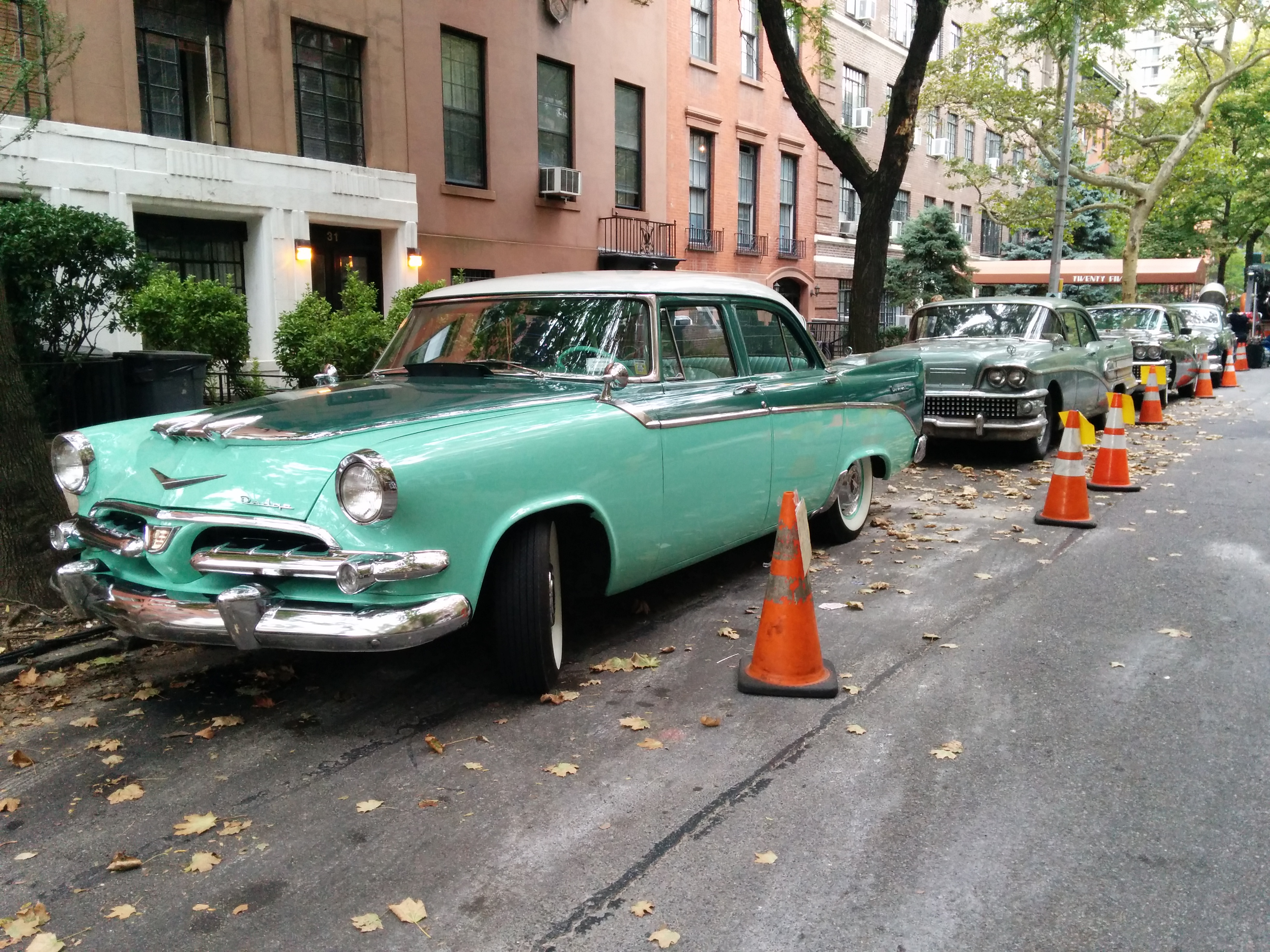
Period vehicles on Monroe Place in Brooklyn Heights during filming

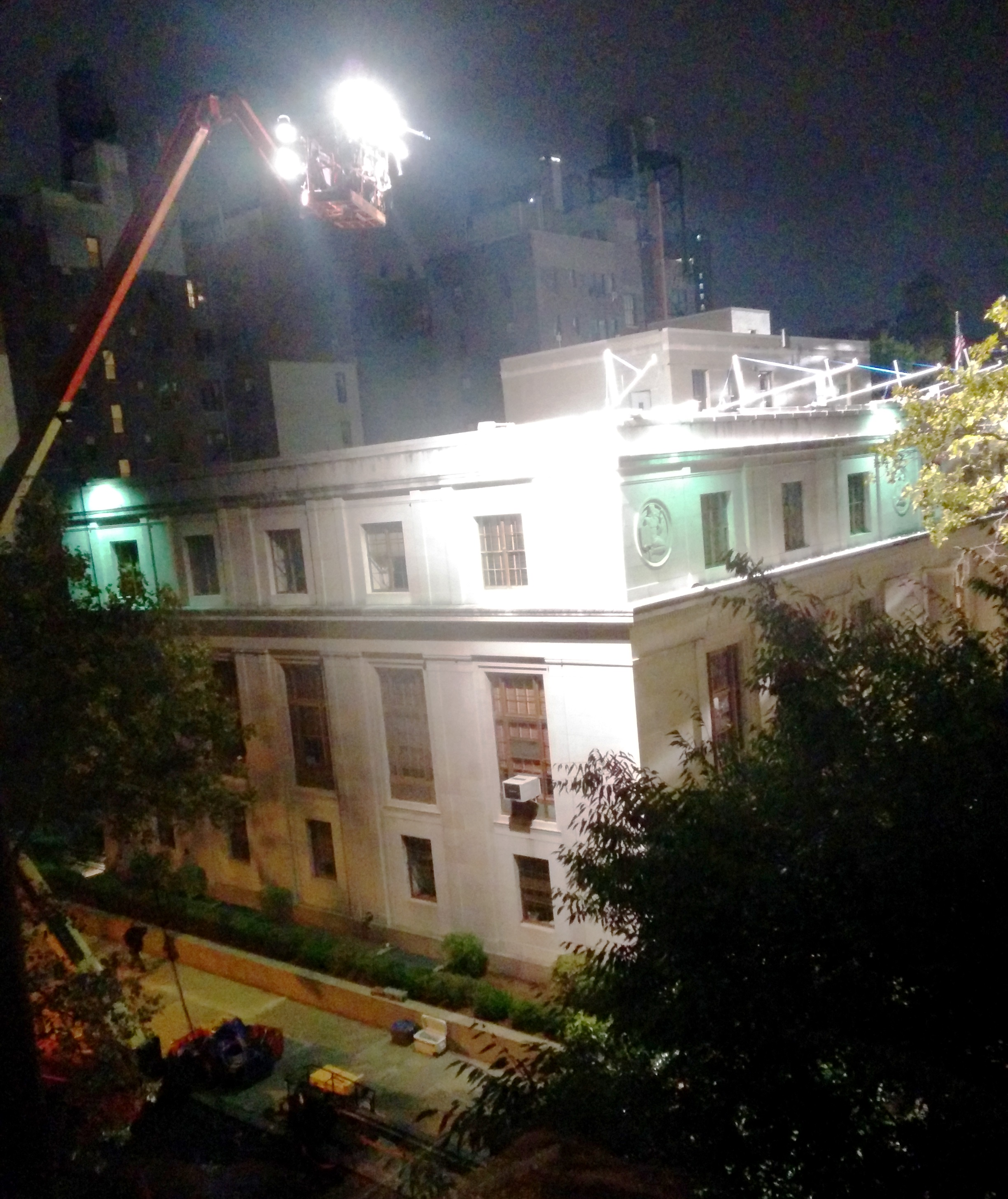
Sprinklers during filming in Brooklyn Heights

== Soundtrack ==
Frequent Spielberg collaborator John Williams was originally announced to compose the film's score. However, Williams had to drop out of production due to a health issue. Thomas Newman was then contacted by Spielberg to replace him, marking Spielberg's first film without Williams' music since 1985's The Color Purple, which was scored by Quincy Jones. Hollywood Records released the film's soundtrack on October 16, 2015.

== Release ==
The theatrical poster for the film was released on June 4, 2015, with the first trailer appearing online the following day. It was distributed in the United States and Canada by Walt Disney Studios Motion Pictures, through the Touchstone Pictures banner. Disney held the film's world premiere on October 4, 2015 at the 53rd annual New York Film Festival. The film went into general theatrical release in the United States on October 16, 2015. 20th Century Fox distributed the film in the remaining international territories.

== Home media ==
The film was released by Walt Disney Studios Home Entertainment (under the Touchstone Home Entertainment banner) on Blu-ray, DVD, and digital download in North America on January 12, 2016, and by 20th Century Fox Home Entertainment in other territories.

== Reception ==
=== Box office ===
Bridge of Spies grossed $72.3 million in North America and $93.3 million in other territories for a worldwide total of $165.6 million, against a budget of $40 million.

In the United States and Canada, pre-release tracking predicted Bridge of Spies to open to around $15–20 million from 2,811 theaters. The film opened alongside Goosebumps, Crimson Peak, and Woodlawn on October 16, 2015, facing particular competition from the former, and also from The Martian, which was entering its third week. The film made $500,000 from its early Thursday night showings and $5.3 million on its first day. In its opening weekend, the film grossed $15.4 million, finishing third at the box office behind Goosebumps ($23.5 million) and The Martian ($21.5 million). Its biggest international markets have been Italy ($12.1 million) and United Kingdom ($11.0 million).

=== Critical response ===
Bridge of Spies received critical acclaim. On Rotten Tomatoes, the film has a rating of 91%, based on 316 reviews, with an average rating of 7.70/10. The site's critical consensus reads, "Bridge of Spies finds new life in Hollywood's classic Cold War espionage thriller formula, thanks to reliably outstanding work from Steven Spielberg and Tom Hanks". On Metacritic, the film has a score of 81 out of 100, based on 48 critics, indicating "universal acclaim". On CinemaScore, audiences gave the film an average grade of "A" on an A+ to F scale.

Richard Roeper of Chicago Sun-Times gave the film four out of four stars and praised Spielberg's direction, saying: "Spielberg has taken an important but largely forgotten, and hardly action-packed slice of the Cold War, and turned it into a gripping character study, and thriller that feels a bit like a John Le Carre adaptation if Frank Capra were at the controls". Michael Phillips of Chicago Tribune called the film "a confident, slightly square, highly satisfying example of old-school Hollywood craftsmanship, starring a major movie star brandishing a briefcase, and a handkerchief, rather than a pistol". The A.V. Club's Ignatiy Vishnevetsky described it as "one of the most handsome movies of Spielberg's latter-day phase, and possibly the most eloquent [...] Bridge of Spies turns a secret prisoner exchange between the CIA and the KGB into a tense and often disarmingly funny cat-and-mouse game". Thomas Sotinel of the French newspaper Le Monde praised the film for harkening back to "classic American cinema", noting Spielberg's virtuosic illustration of the mechanisms of Cold War politics.

On the other hand, Mike Scott of the New Orleans Times-Picayune, had a more mixed reaction, saying: "Bridge of Spies, with its stop-and-go momentum, is also more merely interesting than it is full-on riveting. It's still quite good stuff, but despite its impressive pedigree ... it doesn't feel as if it's quite the sum of all of its parts". Preston Jones of Fort Worth Star-Telegram gave the film two-and-a-half stars out of five. Jones wrote that "For all Spielberg, his star-packed cast, led by Tom Hanks, and his on-screen and off-screen team (Joel and Ethan Coen co-wrote the screenplay) bring to the table, Bridge of Spies is remarkable only for how stuffy and surprisingly inert the film becomes".

== Accolades ==
List of accolades received by Bridge of Spies
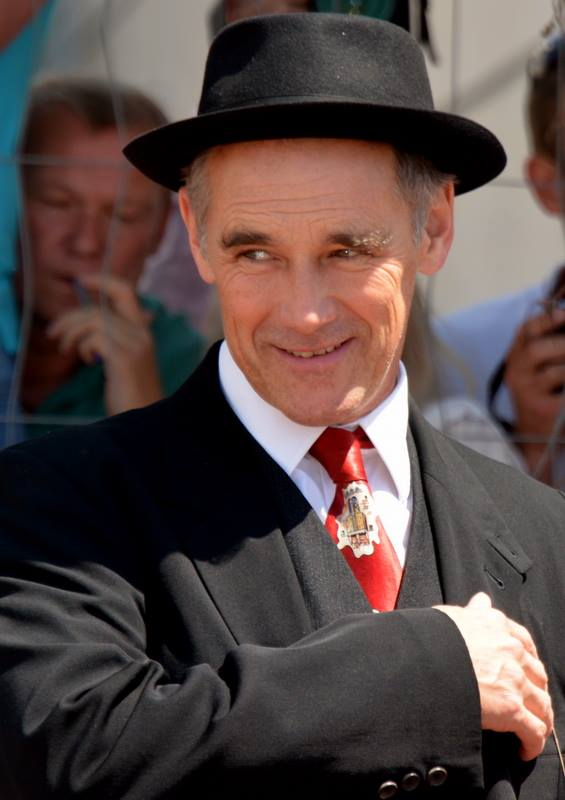
- Mark Rylance received several awards and nominations for his portrayal of Rudolf Abel
Accolades
Award	Won	Nominated
AACTA Awards	1	1
Academy Awards	1	6
Alliance of Women Film Journalists	0	1
American Film Institute	0	1
American Society of Cinematographers	0	1
Art Directors Guild	0	1
Boston Society of Film Critics	1	1
British Academy Film Awards	1	9
Casting Society of America	0	1
Chicago Film Critics Association	0	2
Cinema Audio Society Awards	0	1
Critics' Choice Awards	0	5
Dallas–Fort Worth Film Critics Association	0	1
David di Donatello Awards	1	1
Empire Awards	0	1
Florida Film Critics Circle	0	1
Golden Globes Awards	0	1
Golden Trailer Awards	1	2
Hollywood Film Awards	2	2
Houston Film Critics Society	0	1
London Film Critics' Circle	1	1
Los Angeles Film Critics Association	0	1
Motion Picture Sound Editors	1	1
National Board of Review	1	1
National Society of Film Critics	1	1
New York Film Critics Circle	1	1
New York Film Critics Online	1	1
Online Film Critics Society	0	1
Producers Guild of America Award	0	1
San Diego Film Critics Society	0	1
San Francisco Film Critics Circle	0	2
Satellite Awards	1	5
Saturn Awards	1	1
Screen Actors Guild Awards	0	1
St. Louis Gateway Film Critics Association	0	1
Toronto Film Critics Association	1	1
Vancouver Film Critics Circle	1	1
Visual Effects Society	0	1
Washington D.C. Area Film Critics Association	0	2
Women Film Critics Circle	1	1
Writers Guild of America Award	0	1
- Total number of awards and nominations
Totals	19	67
- References

Bridge of Spies received six nominations at the 88th Academy Awards, including Best Picture, Best Original Screenplay, and Best Original Score. Rylance went on to win the Academy Award for Best Supporting Actor. At the 69th British Academy Film Awards, the film garnered nine nominations and won Best Supporting Actor for Rylance. He also won the Best Supporting Actor award from the AACTA Awards, New York Film Critics Circle, London Film Critics' Circle, Toronto Film Critics Association, and Vancouver Film Critics Circle. Rylance also received nominations at the Golden Globe Awards and the Screen Actors Guild Awards. Both the American Film Institute and the National Board of Review included Bridge of Spies in their top ten films of 2015.

== Historical accuracy ==
Commentators have noted that the shortening of timespans in the film at times gives a misleading impression. Frederic Pryor stated in an interview that various details of the plot related to his involvement were incorrect. He did not cross the Berlin wall during its construction, as he was on vacation in Denmark at the time. He was detained after his return, when he crossed into East Berlin to visit a friend's sister, without knowing that she had fled to West Berlin using "some sort of passport manipulation", and that her apartment was under surveillance to catch anyone attempting to retrieve its contents.

Pryor also stated that the film's depiction of Wolfgang Vogel was unfair, describing Vogel as a nice, quiet, well-spoken man with whom he later became friends and frequently visited.

Donovan did not see Berlin Wall escapees being shot. The only similar incident, the killing of Peter Fechter, happened the summer after the Powers/Abel exchange on the Glienicke Bridge. Donovan was threatened, but he was not shot at in his home, and he did not have his overcoat stolen. The film also changed the location of Donovan's suggestion to the judge to spare Abel for the sake of a possible exchange, which was made in court.

Donovan is presented in the film as a private practice attorney with no mention of any prior association with the United States' intelligence services. However, during WWII Donovan served as the general counsel of the Office of Strategic Services (OSS), shortly before it was re-organized as the CIA.

When interviewed by the Harvard Gazette in 2016, Donovan's granddaughter Beth Amorosi described as "artistic license" the movie's portrayal of his rather antagonistic relationship with his CIA handler ("an amalgam" of several CIA people), whereas he "actually had a very good relationship with the CIA agent he worked with, M.C. Miskovsky". After the spy swap in February 1962, the two again worked successfully together to free 1,200 prisoners from Cuba in December 1962.

There was some controversy over Rylance's decision to portray Abel with a Scottish accent, despite Abel having been born and educated entirely within the Tyneside region of north east England where the Geordie accent is prevalent.

The film depicts Powers' U2 plane being hit by a volley of three SAMs. In reality, his plane was only hit by the first of three, and more than 14 were launched during the incident. A MiG-19 fighter that was scrambled to intercept the plane was also shot down by friendly fire during this salvo, killing the pilot Sergei Safronov.

== See also ==
- Bridge of Spies, a 2010 historical book of the same name that focuses more on the prisoner exchanges
- Hollow Nickel Case
