= 1962 United States Senate election in New York =

- November 6, 1962
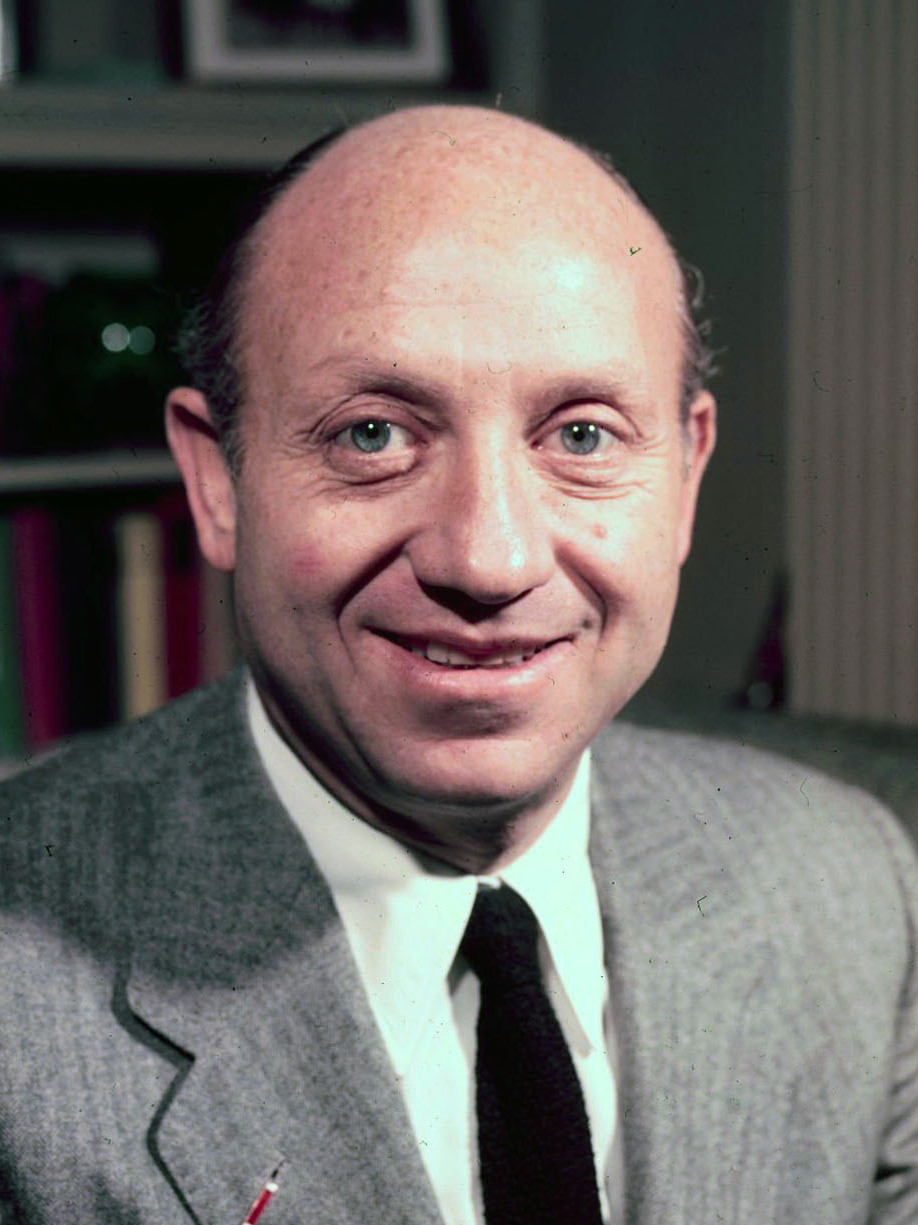

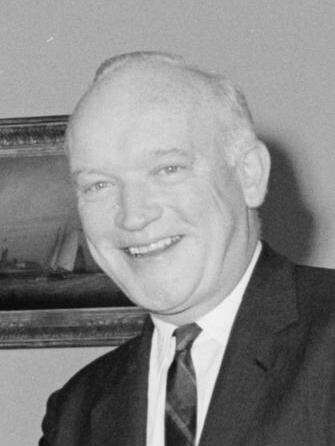
Nominee	Jacob Javits	James B. Donovan
Party	Republican	Democratic
Alliance		Liberal
Popular vote	3,272,417	2,289,323
Percentage	57.38%	40.14%
- County results Javits: 40–50% 50–60% 60–70% 70–80% Donovan: 50–60%
U.S. senator before election
Jacob K. Javits
Republican
Elected U.S. Senator
Jacob K. Javits
Republican

The 1962 United States Senate election in New York was held on November 6, 1962. Incumbent Republican U.S. Senator Jacob Javits won against Democratic challenger James B. Donovan.

== Democratic nomination ==
=== Candidates ===
- James B. Donovan, attorney and Vice Chair of the New York City Board of Education
- Paul O'Dwyer, former member of the New York City Council

=== Convention ===
At the Democratic convention in Syracuse on September 18, Donovan defeated O'Dwyer. His nomination was the last of the night. His nomination, along with most others at the convention, was chiefly the result of a morning leadership conference of party leaders throughout the state.

== General election ==
=== Candidates ===
- James B. Donovan, attorney and Vice Chair of the New York City Board of Education (Democratic and Liberal)
- Stephen Emery (Socialist Labor)
- Carl Feingold (Socialist Workers)
- Jacob Javits, incumbent Senator since 1957 (Republican)
- Kieran O'Doherty (Conservative)

=== Results ===
General election results
Party	Candidate	Votes	%	±%
Republican	Jacob K. Javits (incumbent)	3,272,417	57.38%	▲4.11
Democratic	James B. Donovan	2,113,772	37.06%	▼5.46
Liberal	James B. Donovan	175,551	3.08%	▼1.22
Total	James B. Donovan	2,289,323	40.14%	N/A
Conservative	Kieran O'Doherty	116,151	2.04%	N/A
Socialist Workers	Carl Feingold	17,440	0.31%	N/A
Socialist Labor	Stephen Emery	7,786	0.14%	N/A
Total votes		5,703,117	100.00%	
