= Abel v. United States =

- Supreme Court of the United States

Argued February 24–25, 1959 Reargued November 9, 1959 Decided March 28, 1960
- Full case name: Rudolf Ivanovich Abel, alias Mark, alias Collins, alias Goldfus v. United States
- Citations: 362 U.S. 217 (more) 80 S. Ct. 683; 4 L. Ed. 2d 668

Case history
- Prior: United States v. Abel, 155 F. Supp. 8 (E.D.N.Y. 1957); aff'd, 258 F.2d 485 (2d Cir. 1958); cert. granted, 358 U.S. 813 (1958).

Court membership
- Chief Justice Earl Warren Associate Justices Hugo Black · Felix Frankfurter; William O. Douglas · Tom C. Clark; John M. Harlan II · William J. Brennan Jr. Charles E. Whittaker · Potter Stewart

Case opinions
- Majority: Frankfurter, joined by Clark, Harlan, Whittaker, Stewart
- Dissent: Douglas, joined by Black
- Dissent: Brennan, joined by Warren, Black, Douglas

Laws applied
- U.S. Const. amend. IV

Abel v. United States, 362 U.S. 217 (1960), was a United States Supreme Court case.

== Background ==
The Federal Bureau of Investigation (FBI) suspected Rudolph Abel of being a spy for the Soviet Union. They also suspected him of being in the United States illegally. Rather than arresting him for espionage, the FBI turned over their evidence to the Immigration and Naturalization Service (INS), which has a lower threshold for securing arrest warrants. The INS arrested Abel for being in the United States illegally, but agreed to allow the FBI to try to flip Abel into becoming a double agent against the Soviet Union before carrying out the arrest. The INS apprehended Abel in his hotel room and after Abel refused to flip the INS arrested him. Pursuant to the arrest, the INS searched the hotel room. They allowed Abel to take some papers with him and check out of the hotel, and the INS searched those papers later. The INS searches uncovered evidence of Abel using a false identity and engaging in espionage and turned this evidence over to the FBI. After Abel had checked out of the hotel, the FBI searched the room with the consent of the hotel and found additional evidence of espionage.

The evidence turned up by the INS and FBI searches was used in Abel's trial, in which he was convicted and sentenced to 30 years imprisonment. Abel, represented by James B. Donovan, appealed to the Supreme Court that the searches violated the Fourth Amendment to the United States Constitution and thus the evidence should not have been used at his trial. The Supreme Court granted a writ of certiorari on October 13, 1958, to decide two issues:

- Was the administrative warrant issued by the INS constitutionally adequate to search and seize evidence in Abel's rooms after he was detained for deportation proceedings but not arrested for having committed a crime; and
- Was the Constitution violated when such evidence, unrelated to the immigration interests of the INS, was later used to convict Abel of espionage?

After arguments on these issues the Supreme Court could not come to a decision. Thus the case was re-argued to decide the issues reformed as follows:

- Whether under laws and Constitution of the United States (a) the administrative warrant of the New York Acting District Director of the Immigration and Naturalization Service was validly issued, (b) such administrative warrant constituted a valid basis for arresting petitioner or taking him into custody, and (c) such warrant furnished a valid basis for the searches and seizures affecting his person, luggage, and the room occupied by him at the Hotel Latham;
- Whether, independently of such administrative warrant, petitioner's arrest, and the searches and seizures affecting his person, luggage, and the room occupied by him at the Hotel Latham, were valid under the laws and Constitution of the United States; and
- Whether on the record before [the Court] the issues involved in Questions '1(a)', '1(b)', and '2' are properly before the Court.

== Opinion of the Court ==
The Supreme Court affirmed Abel's conviction in a 5–4 decision. Justice Felix Frankfurter wrote the Court opinion, joined by Justices Tom C. Clark, John Harlan, Potter Stewart and Charles Evans Whittaker. While noting that the government must not be permitted to circumvent the Fourth Amendment by invoking an administrative procedure, the Court accepted the lower courts' findings that the FBI's interaction with the INS in this case was in good faith. The Court then found that the INS searches were made pursuant to a valid arrest, and thus the evidence was discovered appropriately. Further, having appropriately uncovered evidence of a crime, it was appropriate for the INS to share that evidence with the FBI, since this merely represented cooperation between two branches of the United States Department of Justice. Finally, after Abel had checked out of the hotel room, it was appropriate for the hotel to give the FBI permission to search the vacated room, and thus the evidence uncovered by the FBI in its own search was valid.

== Dissenting opinions ==
Four Justices dissented from the decision in two separate opinions. Justice William O. Douglas wrote a dissent that was joined by Justice Hugo Black, and Justice William Brennan wrote a dissent that was joined by Justices Douglas, Black and Chief Justice Earl Warren. The dissenting opinions put forth the view that the evidence was tainted because the FBI did not get a search warrant.

== In popular culture ==
The 2015 Steven Spielberg film Bridge of Spies includes a scene that dramatizes James B. Donovan, portrayed by Tom Hanks, arguing the case before the Supreme Court.
