= James B. Donovan =

American lawyer and US Navy officer

James Donovan
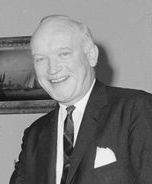
- Born: James Britt Donovan; February 29, 1916; New York City, U.S.
- Died: January 19, 1970 (aged 53); New York City, U.S.
- Education: Fordham University (BA); Harvard University (LLB)
- Occupations: Lawyer; naval officer
- Known for: Negotiating the 1962 exchange of Francis Gary Powers & Frederic Pryor for Rudolf Abel
- Spouse: Mary McKenna (m. 1941)
- Children: 4
- Military career
- Branch: United States Navy
- Service years: 1943–1945
- Rank: Commander

James Britt Donovan (February 29, 1916 – January 19, 1970) was an American lawyer and United States Navy officer in the Office of Scientific Research and Development and the Office of Strategic Services (OSS, predecessor of the Central Intelligence Agency), ultimately becoming General Counsel of the OSS, and an international diplomatic negotiator.

Donovan is widely known for negotiating the 1960–1962 exchange of captured American U-2 pilot Francis Gary Powers and American student Frederic Pryor for Soviet spy Rudolf Abel, and for negotiating the 1962 release and return of 9,703 prisoners held by Cuba after the failed Bay of Pigs Invasion. Donovan was portrayed by Tom Hanks in the 2015 feature film Bridge of Spies.

== Early life and early career ==
James Britt Donovan was born on February 29, 1916, in the Bronx borough of New York City, to Harriet (née O'Connor), a piano teacher, and John J. Donovan, a surgeon. His brother was New York state senator John J. Donovan Jr. Both sides of the family were of Irish descent. He attended the Catholic All Hallows Institute. In 1933, he began his studies at Fordham University, where he completed a Bachelor of Arts degree in English in 1937. He wanted to become a journalist but his father convinced him to study law at Harvard Law School, beginning in autumn of 1937, where he completed his Bachelor of Laws degree in 1940.

After graduating from law school, Donovan started work at a private lawyer's office. He was a commander in the Navy during World War II. In 1942, he became associate general counsel at the Office of Scientific Research and Development. From 1943 to 1945, he was general counsel at the Office of Strategic Services. In 1945, he became assistant to United States Chief Prosecutor Robert H. Jackson at the Nuremberg trials in Germany.

Donovan was the presenter of visual evidence at the trial. While he prepared for the trials he also worked as an advisor for the documentary feature The Nazi Plan.

In 1950, Donovan became a partner in the New York-based law office of Watters and Donovan, specializing in insurance law.

== Release of Gary Powers ==
In 1957, Donovan defended the Soviet spy Rudolf Abel in what was known as the Hollow Nickel Case after many other lawyers refused. He later brought in Thomas M. Debevoise to assist him. Abel was convicted at trial, but Donovan was successful in persuading the court not to impose a death sentence. He appealed Abel's case to the Supreme Court, which in Abel v. United States was rejected by a 5–4 vote. Donovan's argument was that evidence used against his client had been seized by the FBI in violation of the Fourth Amendment. Chief Justice of the United States Earl Warren praised him and publicly expressed the "gratitude of the entire court" for his taking the case.

In 1962, Donovan, who was lead negotiator, and CIA lawyer Milan C. Miskovsky negotiated with Soviet mediators to free captured American pilot Francis Gary Powers. Donovan successfully negotiated for the exchange of Powers, along with American student Frederic Pryor, for the still-imprisoned Rudolf Abel, whom Donovan had defended five years earlier.

This negotiation and preceding events were dramatized by the 2015 historical thriller Bridge of Spies, by Steven Spielberg.

== Involvement in Cuba ==
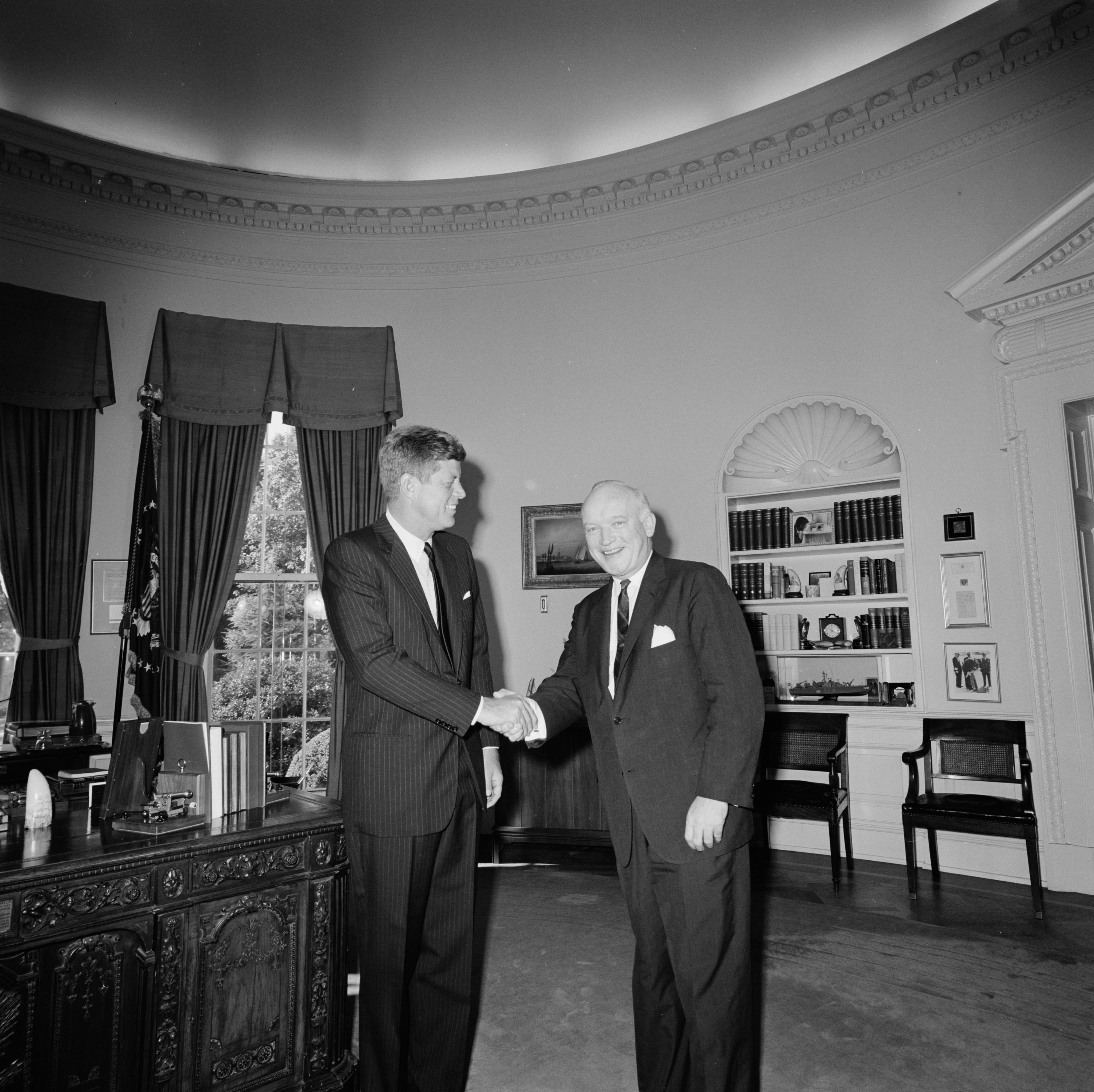
Donovan with President John F. Kennedy in 1962

In June 1962, Donovan was contacted by Cuban exile Pérez Cisneros, who asked him to support the negotiations to free the 1,113 prisoners of the failed Bay of Pigs Invasion. Donovan offered pro bono legal service for the Cuban Families Committee of prisoners' relatives. A few months later, he traveled to Cuba for the first time. Donovan managed to create confidence with Castro, who was pleased that Donovan's teenage son traveled with him to Cuba.

On December 21, 1962, Castro and Donovan signed an agreement to exchange all 1,113 prisoners for $53 million in food and medicine, sourced from private donations and from companies expecting tax concessions. Donovan had the idea to exchange the prisoners for medicine after he had found out that the Cuban medicine did not help him with his own bursitis. By the end of the negotiations, July 3, 1963, Donovan had secured the release of 9,703 men, women and children from Cuban detention. Donovan was once again teamed up with CIA lawyer Milan C. Miskovsky on these negotiations. For his work, Donovan received the Distinguished Intelligence Medal.

== Later life and death ==
From 1961 to 1963, Donovan was vice president of the New York Board of Education, and from 1963 until 1965, he was the president of the board. In June 1962, his alma mater Fordham presented Donovan with an honorary degree. In 1962, he was the Democratic nominee for U.S. Senate in New York but lost in November 1962 to Republican incumbent Jacob K. Javits. In 1968, Donovan was appointed president of Pratt Institute. He died of a heart attack on January 19, 1970, in Brooklyn's Methodist Hospital in New York, after being treated for influenza.

== Personal life ==
In 1941, Donovan married Mary E. McKenna, who was also an Irish American. The couple had a son and three daughters, and lived in Brooklyn, New York, while also maintaining seasonal residences in Spring Lake on the Jersey Shore, New Jersey, and Lake Placid, New York State, where Donovan is buried alongside his wife and daughter. He was a rare book collector, golfer, tennis player and gin rummy player. A collection of his papers is held at Stanford University's Hoover Library & Archives.

== In popular culture ==
The story of the Abel trial and defense, followed by the negotiation and prisoner exchange, was the basis for the book Strangers on a Bridge: The Case of Colonel Abel and Francis Gary Powers, written by Donovan and ghost writer Bard Lindeman, which was published in 1964. Several similar works would come later, but Strangers was the definitive work and was widely critically acclaimed. The book was re-released by Simon & Schuster in August 2015. In 1967, Donovan published his second book, Challenges: Reflections of a Lawyer-at-Large.

James Gregory played Donovan in the 1976 TV movie Francis Gary Powers: The True Story of the U-2 Spy Incident, based on Powers' biography (written with Curt Gentry). Lee Majors played Powers. In 2006, Philip J. Bigger published a biography of Donovan, Negotiator: The Life and Career of James B. Donovan., which was re-released in paperback in January 2017.

Though not officially the basis for the movie Bridge of Spies, Donovan's Strangers on a Bridge is the closest, and is the only first-hand narrative to the dramatic events in the Oscar-winning movie. The 1964 New York Times Best Seller repeated itself in 2015, becoming #1 on the New York Times Best Seller list for espionage books. The book has been widely acclaimed, including by Steven Spielberg and Tom Hanks. The reissue coincided with the pre-release promotion for the movie, directed by Spielberg and written by Matt Charman and the Coen Brothers, which was released on October 16, 2015. Hanks plays the role of Donovan, with Amy Ryan as his wife, Mary.

== Honors ==
In October 2016, Fordham University inducted Donovan into its Hall of Honor in conjunction with its Dodransbicentennial, the 175th anniversary of the school, in a mass at St. Patrick's Cathedral with Cardinal Timothy Dolan, who was also named a founder of the school. Fordham was founded by Archbishop Hughes, who is an ancestor of Donovan. Also in October 2016, Donovan was inducted into the All Hallows School Hall of Fame.

== Works ==
- Donovan, James Britt (1964). Strangers on a Bridge, The Case of Colonel Abel. Atheneum. ISBN 978-1299063778
- Donovan, James B. (1967). Challenges: Reflections of a Lawyer-at-Large. Atheneum, with a preface by former Dean of Harvard Law School, Erwin Griswold.
- Bigger, Philip. (2005). Negotiator: The Life and Career of James B. Donovan. Lehigh University Press.

Party political offices
Preceded by Robert F. Wagner, Jr. 1956	Democratic Nominee for U.S. Senator from New York (Class 3); 1962	Succeeded by Paul O'Dwyer; 1968
Preceded by Robert F. Wagner Jr.	Liberal nominee for U.S. Senator from New York (Class 3); 1962	Succeeded by Jacob Javits
