= Frederic Pryor =

American economist (1933–2019)

- Born: Frederic LeRoy Pryor; April 23, 1933; Owosso, Michigan, U.S.
- Died: September 2, 2019 (aged 86); Newtown Square, Pennsylvania, U.S.
- Occupation: College professor
- Known for: involvement in Cold War "spy swap"
- Spouse: Zora Prochazka

Academic background
- Education: Oberlin College (BA); Yale University (MA, PhD); Free University of Berlin
- Thesis: The Communist Foreign Trade System (1962)

Academic work
- Discipline: Economics
- Institutions: Swarthmore College

Frederic LeRoy Pryor (April 23, 1933 – September 2, 2019) was an American economist. While studying in Berlin during the partition of the city in 1961, he was imprisoned in East Germany for six months, then released in a Cold War "spy swap" that also involved downed American U-2 pilot Francis Gary Powers and Soviet intelligence officer Rudolf Abel. He spent the bulk of his career as a member of the Swarthmore College faculty, as a professor of economics.

== Early life and education ==
Frederic LeRoy Pryor and his twin brother Millard were born in Owosso, Michigan, but spent most of their childhood in Mansfield, Ohio, where they graduated from Mansfield Senior High School in 1951. He attended Oberlin College, where he received a bachelor's degree in chemistry in 1955. He then spent a year in South America and Europe, which included three months living and working on a commune in Paraguay. He studied economics at Yale University, where he received a master's degree in 1957, then undertook a doctorate program.

== Cold War incident ==
In 1959, as part of his doctorate studies, Pryor went to Berlin, where he was finishing his doctoral thesis and also taking classes at the Free University of West Berlin. In August 1961, days after the Berlin Wall was erected, he visited East Berlin to deliver a copy of his dissertation to a professor there, and to contact a friend's sister, an engineer who – unknown to Pryor – in violation of East German law, had just fled to West Germany. The Stasi (East German secret police) arrested Pryor on charges of aiding the woman's escape; after the police found a copy of Pryor's doctoral dissertation (an analysis of Soviet bloc foreign trade), he was accused of espionage and detained in Hohenschönhausen prison. Pryor's cell was directly above an East German torture room. While jailed, Pryor was intensively interrogated, although not tortured.

On February 10, 1962, after almost six months of detention, Pryor was freed at Checkpoint Charlie, just before American U-2 pilot Francis Gary Powers was swapped for Soviet Spy Colonel Rudolf Abel at the Glienicke Bridge between West Berlin and Potsdam, East Germany, as a result of negotiations conducted by James B. Donovan.

Pryor's involvement in this incident is dramatized as a subplot in the 2015 film Bridge of Spies starring Tom Hanks as Donovan. Actor Will Rogers depicted Pryor. Pryor was not consulted for the film, about which he commented, "It was good. But they took a lot of liberties with it."

== Career ==
Pryor received his doctorate from Yale in 1962, but his purported involvement in espionage and his imprisonment limited job opportunities in government—his preferred career—or industry. Pryor did not want to teach but went to work in academia, as an economics instructor at the University of Michigan until 1964 and as a staff research economist at Yale until 1967. He joined the economics faculty at Swarthmore College in 1967; "Swarthmore didn't care" about his imprisonment, Pryor recalled. "In fact, I think the students kind of got a kick out of having an ex-con teaching them". He became a full professor, and chaired the department for three periods in the 1980s. Pryor specialized in comparative economics; he retired from active work at the college in 1998, but remained a professor emeritus. Pryor published 13 books and more than 130 scholarly articles.

Pryor worked as an economic advisor in Ukraine and Latvia, was employed as a consultant to the World Bank in Africa, served as a Research Director to the Pennsylvania Tax Commission, and was a research associate at both the Hoover Institution in Palo Alto, California, and the Brookings Institution in Washington, D.C. He twice served as judge of elections, a local elected position in Pennsylvania. He won research grants from the National Science Foundation, the National Council of Soviet and East European Studies, and the Carnegie Endowment for International Peace. He served as a trustee at historically black colleges such as Miles College, Wilberforce University, and Tougaloo College.

== Personal life ==
On March 26, 1964, Pryor married Zora Prochazka, who was also an economist. They remained together until her death in 2008.

Pryor died on September 2, 2019, in Newtown Square, Pennsylvania, where he had lived the final 11 years of his life. He was survived by his son and three grandchildren.

== Works ==
- Pryor, Frederic (1963). The Communist Foreign Trade System. Cambridge, Massachusetts: The M.I.T. Press. ISBN 9780262160087.
- Pryor, Frederic L. (1985). A Guidebook to the Comparative Study of Economic Systems. Englewood Cliffs, New Jersey: Prentice-Hall, Inc. ISBN 0133688534.
