= Rudolf Abel =

Soviet intelligence officer (1903–1971)

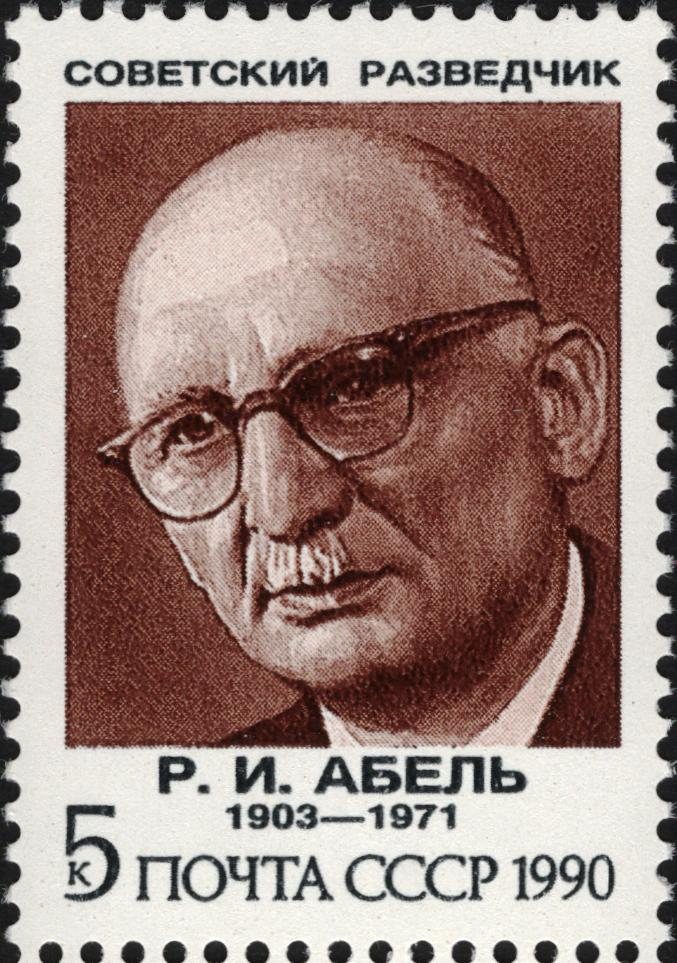
- Abel on a 1990 USSR commemorative stamp
- Born: William August Fisher; 11 July 1903; Benwell, Northumberland, England
- Died: 15 November 1971 (aged 68); Moscow, Russian SFSR, Soviet Union
- Burial place: Donskoye Cemetery
- Spouse: Elena Stepanovna Lebedeva (m. 1927)
- Children: 1
- Awards: Order of the Red Banner
- Espionage activity
- Allegiance: Soviet Union
- Rank: Colonel
- Codename: Andrew Yurgesovich Kayotis
- Codename: Emil Robert Goldfus
- Codename: Mark Collins
- Codename: MARK
- Codename: ALEC
- Operations: World War II (1944–1945); Soviet Cold War spy (1948–1957)

William August Fisher (11 July 1903 – 15 November 1971), better known by the alias Rudolf Ivanovich Abel (Russian: Рудольф Иванович Абель), was a Soviet intelligence officer. He adopted his alias to alert his Soviet KGB handlers when he was arrested in the United States on charges of espionage by the FBI in 1957.

Fisher was born and grew up in Newcastle upon Tyne in the North East of England in the United Kingdom to Russian émigré parents. He moved to Russia in the 1920s, and served in the Soviet military before undertaking foreign service as a radio operator in Soviet intelligence in the late 1920s and early 1930s. He later served in an instructional role before taking part in intelligence operations against the Germans during World War II. After the war, he began working for the KGB, which sent him to the United States where he worked as part of a spy ring based in New York City.

In 1957, Fisher was convicted in US federal court on three counts of conspiracy as a Soviet spy for his involvement in what became known as the Hollow Nickel Case and sentenced to 30 years' imprisonment at Atlanta Federal Penitentiary in Georgia. He served just over four years of his sentence before he was exchanged for captured American U-2 pilot Francis Gary Powers and Yale University doctoral student Frederic Pryor. Back in the Soviet Union, he lectured on his experiences. He died in 1971 at the age of 68. His real identity and country of birth were only revealed after his death.

== Early life ==
Fisher was born William August Fisher on 11 July 1903, in the Benwell area of Newcastle upon Tyne, England, the second son of Heinrich and Lyubov Fisher. Revolutionary activists of the Tsarist era, his father was of German origins and his mother was of Russian descent. Fisher's father taught and agitated with Vladimir Lenin at Saint Petersburg Technological Institute.

In 1896, Heinrich Fisher was arrested for sedition and sentenced to three years internal exile. As he had served a sentence for offenses against the Russian Imperial Crown, he was forced to flee to the United Kingdom in 1901, the alternative being deportation to Germany or imprisonment in Russia for avoidance of military service. While living in the United Kingdom, Fisher's father, a keen Bolshevik, took part in gunrunning, shipping arms from northeast England to Russia's Baltic coast.

Fisher and his brother, Henry, won scholarships to Whitley Bay High School and Monkseaton High School. Though Fisher was not as hard-working as Henry, he showed aptitude for science, mathematics, languages, art and music, inherited in part from his father's abilities. Encouraging their son's love of music, Fisher's parents gave him piano lessons; he also learned to play the guitar. It was during this period that Fisher developed an interest in amateur radio, constructing rudimentary spark transmitters and receivers.

Fisher became an apprentice draughtsman at Swan Hunter, Wallsend, and attended evening classes at Rutherford College before being accepted into London University in 1920. Though Fisher qualified for university, the costs prohibited him from attending. In 1921, following the Russian Revolution, the Fisher family left Newcastle upon Tyne to return to Moscow.

== Early career ==
Fluent in English, Russian, German, Polish and Yiddish, Fisher worked for the Comintern as a translator following his family's return to the Soviet Union. Trained as a radio operator, he served in a Red Army radio battalion in 1925 and 1926. He then worked briefly in the radio research institute before being recruited by the OGPU, a predecessor of the KGB, in May 1927. That year he married Elena Lebedeva, a harp student at Moscow Conservatory. They had one child together, a daughter named Evelyn who was born on 8 October 1929. During his interview with the OGPU, it was determined he should adopt a Russian-sounding name and William August Fisher became Vilyam Genrikhovich Fisher. Following his recruitment, he worked for the OGPU as a radio operator in Norway, Turkey, the United Kingdom, and France. He returned to the Soviet Union in 1936, as head of a school that trained radio operators destined for duty in illegal residences. One of the students was the Canadian-born Russian spy Kitty Harris, who was later more widely known as "The Spy with Seventeen Names".

Despite his foreign birth and the accusation that his brother-in-law was a Trotskyist, Fisher narrowly escaped the Great Purge. However, in 1938 he was dismissed from the NKVD, the moniker the OGPU had adopted in 1934. During World War II, he again trained radio operators for clandestine work behind German lines. Having been adopted as a protégé by Pavel Sudoplatov, he took part in Operation Scherhorn (Операция Березино, Operatsiya Berezino) in August 1944. Sudoplatov later described this operation as "the most successful radio deception game of the war". Fisher's role in this operation was rewarded with what his superiors regarded as one of the most prestigious postings in Soviet foreign intelligence, the United States.

== KGB service ==
After rejoining the KGB in 1946, Fisher was trained as a spy for entry into the United States. In October 1948, using a Soviet passport, he travelled from Leningradsky Station to Warsaw. In Warsaw, he discarded his Soviet passport and using a U.S. passport traveled from Czechoslovakia and Switzerland to Paris. His new passport bore the name Andrew Kayotis, the first of Fisher's false identities. The real Andrew Kayotis was Lithuanian born and had become an American citizen after migrating to the United States. Kayotis had applied for and received a visa to visit the Soviet Union. However, the Soviets retained his passport, which Fisher eventually used. Kayotis had been in poor health and died while visiting relatives in Vilnius, Lithuania. Fisher, as Kayotis, then travelled aboard the RMS Scythia from Le Havre, France, to North America, disembarking at Quebec. Still using Kayotis' passport, he went to Montreal and crossed into the United States on 17 November.

On 26 November, Fisher met with Soviet "illegal" Iosif Grigulevich (codenamed "MAKS" or "ARTUR"). Grigulevich gave Fisher a genuine birth certificate, a forged draft card and a forged tax certificate, all under the name of Emil Robert Goldfus, along with $1,000. After handing back Kayotis's passport and documents, Fisher assumed the name Goldfus. His codename was "MARK". The real Goldfus had died at only 14 months, having been born on 2 August 1902, in New York. Goldfus's birth certificate was obtained by the NKVD at the end of the Spanish Civil War, when the Centre would collect identity documents from International Brigades members for use in espionage operations.

In July 1949, Fisher met with a "legal" KGB resident from the Soviet consulate general, who provided him with money. Shortly afterwards Fisher was ordered to reactivate the "Volunteer" network to smuggle atomic secrets to Russia. Members of the network had stopped cooperating after postwar security was tightened at Los Alamos. Lona Cohen (codenamed "LESLE") and her husband Morris Cohen (codenamed "LUIS" and "VOLUNTEER") had run the Volunteer network and were seasoned couriers. Theodore "Ted" Hall (codenamed "MLAD"), a physicist, was the most important agent in the network in 1945, passing atomic secrets from Los Alamos. The Volunteer network grew to include "Aden" and "Serb", nuclear physicists contacted by Hall, and "Silver". Fisher spent most of his first year organizing his network. While it is not known for certain where Fisher went or what he did, it is believed he travelled to Santa Fe, New Mexico, the collection point for stolen diagrams from the Manhattan Project. Kitty Harris, a former pupil of Fisher's, had spent a year in Santa Fe during the war, where she passed secrets from physicists to couriers. During this period, Fisher received the Order of the Red Banner, an important Soviet decoration normally reserved for military personnel.

In 1950, Fisher's illegal residency was endangered by the arrest of Julius and Ethel Rosenberg, for whom Lona Cohen had been a courier. The Cohens were quickly spirited to Mexico before moving on to Moscow. They were to resurface in the United Kingdom using the identities of Peter and Helen Kroger. Fisher was relieved when the Rosenbergs did not disclose any information about him to the Federal Bureau of Investigation (FBI), but the arrests heralded a bleak outlook for his new spy network. However, on 21 October 1952, as instructed by Moscow, Reino Häyhänen left a thumbtack on a signpost in New York's Central Park. The thumbtack signaled to Fisher that Häyhänen, his new assistant, had arrived.

Codenamed "VIK", Häyhänen arrived in New York on the RMS Queen Mary, under the alias Eugene Nikolai Maki. The real Maki had been born in the United States to a Finnish-American father and a New York mother in 1919. In 1927, the family migrated to Estonia. In 1948, the KGB had called Häyhänen to Moscow where they issued him a new assignment. In 1949, Häyhänen freely obtained Maki's birth certificate. He had then spent three years in Finland taking over Maki's identity. After arriving in New York, Häyhänen spent the next two years establishing his identity. During that time he received money from his superiors left in dead-letter boxes in the Bronx and Manhattan. It is known he occasionally drew attention to himself by indulging in heavy drinking sessions and heated arguments with his Finnish wife Hannah.

For six months Häyhänen checked the thumbtack and no one had made contact. He also checked a dead-drop location he had memorized. There he found a hollowed-out nickel; however, before he opened the nickel to examine its contents, Häyhänen lost it, either by buying a newspaper with it or using it to pay for a subway ride. For the next seven months the hollow nickel circulated through the New York City economy, unopened. The trail of the hollow nickel ended when a thirteen-year-old newsboy was collecting for his weekly deliveries. The newsboy noticed that the nickel made an unusual sound - when he dropped it on the floor, it broke in half, revealing a microphotograph containing a series of numbers. The newsboy eventually turned the nickel over to a New York City police detective, who in turn forwarded it to the FBI. From 1953 to 1957, every effort was made to decipher the microphotograph, but the FBI was unable to solve the mystery, which came to be known as the Hollow Nickel Case.

Late in 1953, Fisher moved to Brooklyn and rented a room in a boarding house on Hicks Street. He also rented a fifth-floor studio at the Ovington Studios Building on Fulton Street. Since he was posing as an artist and photographer, nobody questioned his irregular working hours and frequent disappearances. Over time his artistic technique improved and he became a competent painter, though he disliked abstract painting, preferring more conventional styles. He mingled with New York artists, who were surprised by his admiration for the Russian painter Isaak Levitan, although Fisher was careful not to discuss Stalinist "socialist realism". The only visitors to Fisher's studio were artist friends with whom he felt safe from suspicion. In particular, he became a friend of Burton Silverman. Fisher sometimes related made-up stories of previous lives, as a Boston accountant and a lumberjack in the Pacific Northwest.

In 1954, Häyhänen began working as Fisher's assistant. He was to deliver a report from a Soviet agent at the United Nations secretariat, to a dead-letter box for collection. However the report never arrived. Fisher was disturbed by Häyhänen's lack of work ethics and his obsession with alcohol. In the spring of 1955, Fisher and Häyhänen visited Bear Mountain Park, and buried $5,000 (equivalent to $60,093 in 2025), destined for the wife of the Soviet spy Morton Sobell, who in 1951 was sentenced to 30 years in jail.

In 1955, Fisher, exhausted by the constant pressure, returned to Moscow for six months of rest and recuperation, leaving Häyhänen in charge. While in Moscow, Fisher informed his superiors of his dissatisfaction with Häyhänen. Upon his return to New York in 1956, he found that his carefully constructed network had been left to disintegrate in his absence. Fisher checked his drop points only to find messages several months old, while Häyhänen's radio transmissions had routinely been sent from the same location using incorrect radio frequencies. The money Häyhänen received from the KGB to support the network was instead spent on alcohol and prostitutes.

By early 1957, Fisher had lost patience with Häyhänen and demanded that Moscow recall his deputy. In January 1957, Häyhänen received a message from Moscow promoting him to Lieutenant Colonel and granting him leave in the Soviet Union. Upon hearing he was due to return to Moscow, Häyhänen was fearful that he would be severely disciplined or even executed. Häyhänen fabricated stories to justify his delay, claiming to Fisher that the FBI had taken him off the RMS Queen Mary. Fisher, unsuspecting, advised Häyhänen to leave the U.S. immediately to avoid FBI surveillance and handed him $200 for travel expenses. Prior to his departure, Häyhänen returned to Bear Mountain Park and retrieved the buried $5,000 for his own use. Häyhänen arrived in Paris on May Day, having sailed from the U.S. aboard La Liberté. Making contact with the KGB residency he received another $200 for his journey to Moscow. Four days later, instead of continuing his journey to the Soviet Union he entered the American embassy in Paris, announcing that he was a KGB officer and asking for asylum.

When Häyhänen announced himself at the embassy on 4 May, he appeared drunk. The Central Intelligence Agency (CIA) officials at the Paris embassy did not find Häyhänen's story credible. They were not convinced he might actually be a Russian spy until he produced a hollow Finnish 5-mark coin. Upon opening the coin a square of microfilm was revealed. On 11 May, the CIA returned him to the United States and handed him over to the FBI. As a member of a Soviet spy ring operating on American soil, Häyhänen came under the FBI's jurisdiction and they began verifying his story.

Upon his arrival in the United States, Häyhänen was interrogated by the FBI and proved very cooperative. He admitted his first Soviet contact in New York had been "MIKHAIL" and upon being shown a series of photographs of Soviet officials identified "MIKHAIL" as Mikhail Svirin. Svirin, however, had returned to Moscow two years previously. The FBI then turned its attention to Svirin's replacement. Häyhänen was able only to provide Fisher's codename, "MARK", and a description. He was, however, able to tell the FBI about Fisher's studio and its location. Häyhänen was also able to solve the mystery of the "hollow nickel," which the FBI had been unable to decipher for four years.

The KGB did not discover Häyhänen's defection until August, although it is more than likely they notified Fisher earlier when Häyhänen failed to arrive in Moscow. As a precaution, Fisher was ordered to leave the United States. Escape was complicated because, if "MARK" had been compromised by Häyhänen, Fisher's other identities could have been compromised as well. Fisher could not leave the country as Martin Collins, Emil Goldfus, or Andrew Kayotis, the latter of which had faded into obscurity. The KGB Center, with the help of KGB's Ottawa resident, set about procuring two new passports for Fisher in the names of Robert Callan and Vasili Dzogol, but this process would take time. The Canadian Communist Party succeeded in obtaining a new passport for Fisher in the name of Robert Callan. Fisher, however, was arrested before he could adopt his new identity and leave the United States.

== Capture ==
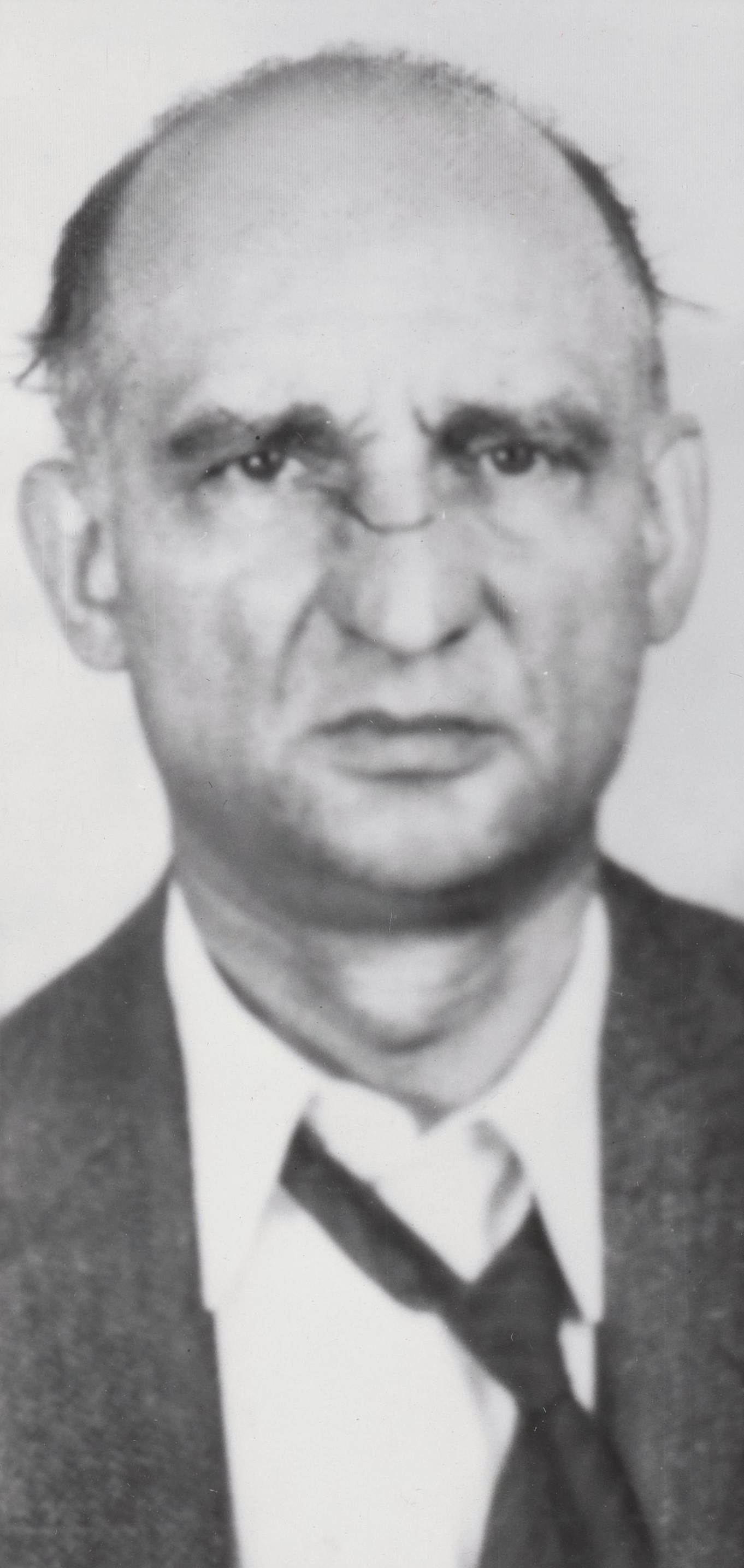
Abel's FBI mugshot, 1957

In April 1957, Fisher told his artist friends he was going south on a seven-week holiday. Less than three weeks later, acting on Häyhänen's information, surveillance was established near Fisher's photo studio. On 28 May 1957, in a small park opposite Fulton Street, FBI agents spotted a man acting nervously. From time to time the man got up, walked around, and eventually left. FBI agents were convinced he fit the description of "MARK". The surveillance continued on "MARK" and, on the night of 13 June, a light was seen to go on in Fisher's studio at 10:00 pm.

On 15 June 1957, Häyhänen was shown a photograph of Fisher taken by the FBI with a hidden camera. Häyhänen confirmed that it was "MARK" in the photograph. Once the FBI had a positive identification, they stepped up surveillance, following Fisher from his studio to the Hotel Latham. Fisher was aware of the "tail" but, as he had no passport to leave the country, he devised a plan to be used upon his capture. Fisher decided that he would not turn traitor as Häyhänen had done because he still trusted the KGB and he knew that if he cooperated with the FBI, he would not see his wife and daughter again.

At 7:00 am on 21 June 1957, Fisher answered a knock on the door to his room, Room 839. Upon opening the door, he was confronted by FBI agents who addressed him as "colonel" and stated that they had "information concerning [his] involvement in espionage." Fisher knew that the FBI's use of his rank could have only come from Häyhänen. Fisher said nothing to the FBI and, after spending twenty-three minutes staring at Fisher, the FBI agents called in the waiting Immigration and Naturalization Service officers who arrested Fisher and detained him under section 242 of the Immigration and Nationality Act.

Fisher was then flown to the Federal Alien Detention Facility in McAllen, Texas, and held there for six weeks. During this period Fisher stated that his "real" name was Rudolf Ivanovich Abel and that he was a Soviet citizen, although he refused to discuss his intelligence activities. The name "Rudolf Ivanovich Abel" was that of a deceased friend and a KGB colonel; Fisher knew as soon as The Centre saw the name Abel on the front pages of American newspapers they would realize he had been captured.

During Fisher's detention, the FBI had been searching his hotel room and photo studio, where they discovered espionage equipment including shortwave radios, cipher pads, cameras and film for producing microdots, a hollow shaving brush, and numerous "trick" containers including hollowed-out bolts. In Fisher's New York hotel room the FBI found $4,000, a hollow ebony block containing a 250-page Russian codebook, a hollow pencil containing encrypted messages on microfilm and a key to a safe-deposit box containing another $15,000 in cash. Also discovered were photographs of the Cohens and recognition phrases to establish contact between agents who had never met before.

As Fisher was no longer considered an alleged illegal alien, but rather an alleged spy, he was flown from Texas to New York on 7 August 1957, to answer the indictment. Fisher was subsequently indicted to stand trial as a Soviet spy. The Brooklyn Bar Association approached several prominent trial lawyers with political ambitions, all of whom declined the case. They then contacted James B. Donovan. Because he had served as a wartime counsel in the Office of Strategic Services (OSS) and had years of courtroom experience, the Bar Association believed Donovan was uniquely qualified to act as Fisher's defense lawyer. At Donovan's initial meeting with Fisher, the latter accepted Donovan as his defense counsel. Donovan subsequently brought in attorney Thomas M. Debevoise to assist him; Fisher was tried in the United States District Court for the Eastern District of New York in Brooklyn during October 1957, on three counts:

- Conspiracy to transmit defense information to the Soviet Union – 30 years imprisonment;
- Conspiracy to obtain defense information – 10 years imprisonment; and
- Conspiracy to act in the United States as an agent of a foreign government without notification to the Secretary of State – 5 years imprisonment.

Häyhänen, Fisher's former assistant, testified against him at the trial. The prosecution failed to find any other alleged members of Fisher's spy network, if there were any. The jury retired for three and a half hours and returned on the afternoon of 25 October 1957, finding Fisher guilty on all three counts. On 15 November 1957, Judge Mortimer W. Byers imposed on Fisher a total sentence of thirty years and fines of $3,000. In Abel v. United States, the United States Supreme Court upheld his conviction by a vote of 5-4.

Fisher, or "Rudolf Ivanovich Abel", was to serve his sentence (as prisoner 80016–A) at Atlanta Federal Penitentiary, Georgia. He occupied himself with painting, learning silk-screening, playing chess, and writing logarithmic tables for the sheer enjoyment of it. He became friends with two other convicted Soviet spies. One of these was Morton Sobell, whose wife had failed to receive the $5,000 embezzled by Häyhänen. The other prisoner was Kurt Ponger, an Austrian who had been sentenced for conspiracy to commit espionage.

== Release and later life ==
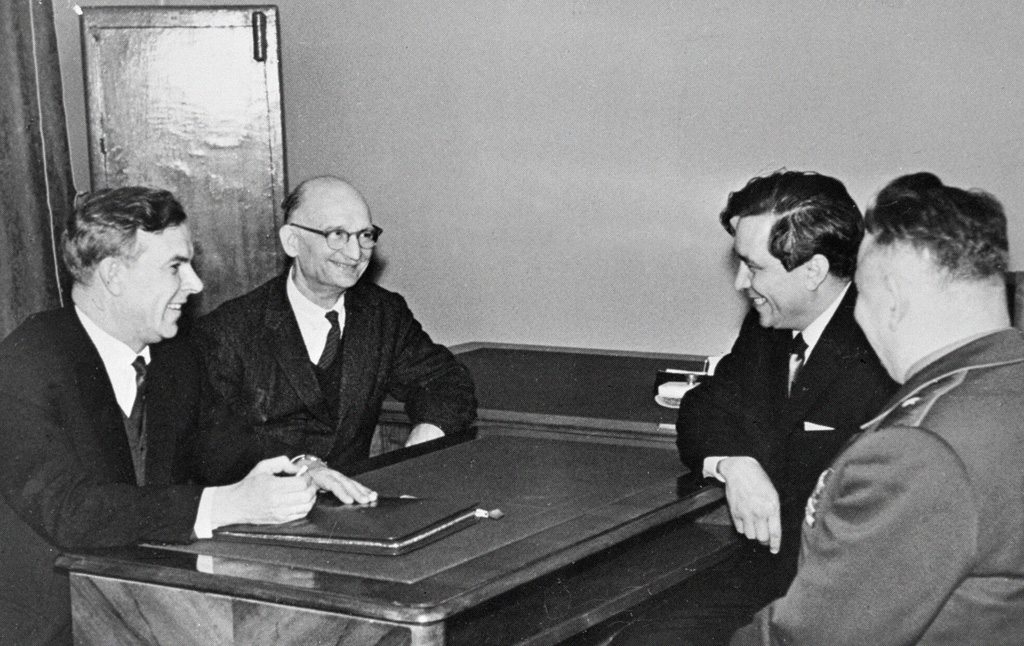
Vladimir Semichastny, chairman of the KGB, talking to Soviet intelligence officers Rudolf Abel (second from left) and Konon Molody (second from right) in September 1964

Fisher served just over four years of his sentence. On 10 February 1962, he was exchanged for the shot-down American U-2 pilot Francis Gary Powers. The exchange took place on the Glienicke Bridge that linked West Berlin with Potsdam, which became famous during the Cold War as the "Bridge of Spies". At precisely the same time, at Checkpoint Charlie, Frederic Pryor was released by the East German Stasi into the waiting arms of his father. A few days later Fisher, reunited with his wife Elena and daughter Evelyn, flew home.

For the sake of its own reputation it suited the KGB to reveal "Abel's" nine years of being an undetected agent in the United States as a triumph by a dedicated NKVD member. The idea that the name of the master spy was Rudolf Abel replaced the reality of Fisher. During his eight years as an illegal resident, Fisher was one of the most successful KGB agents in the United States. Even though he appears not to have recruited a single agent, he identified potential spies and managed and expanded the existing network so well that CIA director Allen Dulles said, "I wish we had three or four like him inside [the USSR] right now."

After his return to Moscow, Fisher was employed by the Illegals Directorate of the KGB's First Chief Directorate, giving speeches and lecturing school children on intelligence work, but became increasingly disillusioned. He made a notable appearance in the foreword to the Soviet spy film Dead Season and also worked as a consultant on the film.

A heavy smoker, Fisher died of lung cancer on 15 November 1971. His ashes were interred at the Donskoye Cemetery under his real name, next to Konon Molody who had died the previous year. A few Western correspondents were invited there to view for themselves the true identity of the spy who never "broke".

== Legacy ==
- His fate inspired Vadim Kozhevnikov to write the adventure novel Shield and Sword. Although the name of the main character is Alexander Belov and is associated with Abel's name, the plot of the book is significantly different from the real fate of William August Fisher.
- In Steven Spielberg's 2015 film Bridge of Spies, Fisher/Abel is portrayed by Mark Rylance. For his performance, Rylance won the Academy Award for Best Supporting Actor and the BAFTA Award for Best Actor in a Supporting Role.
- On 18 December 2015, on the eve of the Day of State Security Officers (a professional holiday), a grand opening ceremony of the memorial plaque to William Genrikhovich Fisher took place in Samara. The plaque, authored by Samara architect Dmitry Khramov, appeared on 8, Molodogvardeyskaya Street. It is believed that exactly here the family of the intelligence officer lived during the years of World War II. William Genrikhovich himself at that time taught radio business at a secret intelligence school, and later led a counterintelligence radio operation against German intelligence from Kuibyshev.
- In 1990, the USSR released a set of stamps entitled "Intelligence Agents" depicting Abel, Stanislav Vaupshasov, Ivan Kudrya, Kim Philby and Konon Molody.

== Bibliography ==
- Andrew, Christopher. (1999). The Sword and the Shield: The Mitrokhin Archive and the Secret History of the KGB. Basic Books. New York. ISBN 0-465-00310-9.
- Arthey, Vin. (2004). Like Father Like Son: A Dynasty of Spies. St. Ermin's Press in association with Little Brown. London. ISBN 1-903608-07-4.
- Bernikow, Louise. (1970). Abel. Introduction by Burt Silverman. Hodder and Stoughton. London, Sydney, Auckland, Toronto. ISBN 0-340-12593-4.
- Bigger, Philip J. (2006). NEGOTIATOR: The Life And Career of James B. Donovan. Bethlehem: Lehigh University Press. United States. ISBN 978-0-934-22385-0.
- Damaskin, Igor with Elliott, Geoffrey. (2001). Kitty Harris: The Spy With Seventeen Names. St. Ermin's Press. London. ISBN 1-903608-06-6.
- Donovan, James B. (1964). Strangers On A Bridge: The Case of Colonel Abel. Atheneum House, Inc. New York. LCCN 64-14248
- Hearn, Chester G. (2006). Spies & Espionage: A Directory. Thunder Bay Press. San Diego, California. ISBN 978-1-59223-508-7.
- Romerstein, Herbert. (2001). The Venona Secrets: Exposing Soviet Espionage and America's Traitors. Regnery Publishing Ltd. Washington, D.C. ISBN 978-0-89526-225-7.
- Sudoplatov, Pavel; Sudoplatov, Anatoli; Schecter, Jerrold L. and Schecter, Leona. (1994). Special Tasks: The Memoirs of an Unwanted Witness, a Soviet Spymaster. Little Brown. Toronto, Canada. ISBN 0-316-77352-2.
- Whittell, Giles. (2010). A True Story of the Cold War: Bridge of Spies. Broadway Books. New York. ISBN 978-0-7679-3107-6.
