= Francis Gary Powers =

American pilot (1929–1977)

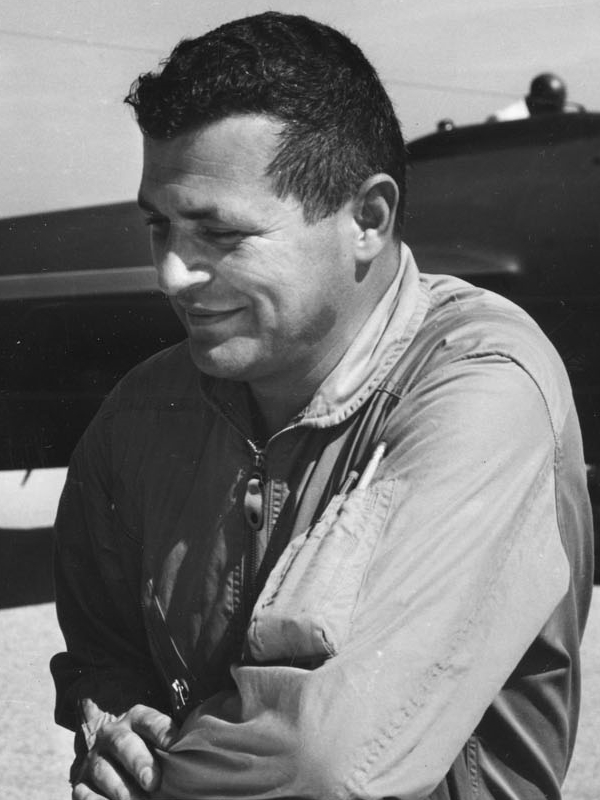
- Powers in 1964
- Born: August 17, 1929; Jenkins, Kentucky, U.S.
- Died: August 1, 1977 (aged 47); Los Angeles, California, U.S.
- Cause of death: Helicopter crash
- Resting place: Arlington National Cemetery
- Education: Milligan College (BS)
- Known for: 1960 U-2 incident
- Spouses: Barbara Gay Moore (m. 1955; div. 1963) Claudia Edwards Downey (m. 1963)
- Children: 2
- Awards: Silver Star; Distinguished Flying Cross; Prisoner of War Medal; National Defense Service Medal; Intelligence Star; Director's Award
- Aviation career
- Air force: United States Air Force
- Rank: Captain

Francis Gary Powers (August 17, 1929 – August 1, 1977) was an American pilot who served as a United States Air Force officer and a CIA employee. Powers is best known for his involvement in the 1960 U-2 incident, when he was shot down while flying a secret CIA spying mission over the Soviet Union. Powers survived, but was captured and sentenced to 10 years in a Soviet prison for espionage. He served 21 months of his sentence before being released in a prisoner swap in 1962.

After returning to the US, he worked at Lockheed as a test pilot for the U-2, and later as a helicopter pilot for Los Angeles news station KNBC. He died in 1977, when the KNBC helicopter he was flying crashed.

== Early life and education ==
Powers was born August 17, 1929, in Jenkins, Kentucky, the son of Oliver, a coal miner, and his wife Ida. Powers was the only boy among the family's six children. Oliver, who often struggled to make ends meet, wanted his son to be a physician. When Powers was fourteen, he rode in a Piper Cub airplane at a state fair in West Virginia, sparking his fascination with aviation.

During World War II, the Powers family briefly moved to Detroit, where Oliver had taken a job at a defense plant, before returning to Grundy, Virginia, where Powers finished high school. Powers then entered Milligan College as a pre-med student, but switched majors to biology and chemistry in his third year. He graduated with a Bachelor of Science degree in 1950.

== United States Air Force ==
Powers enlisted in the United States Air Force in October 1950, initially working as a photo lab technician. He was accepted for flight training in November 1951, and was commissioned as a second lieutenant in December 1952 after completing advanced training on T-33 and F-80 aircraft at Williams Air Force Base in Arizona. While assigned to gunnery school at Luke Air Force Base, a bout of appendicitis delayed his training, and the Korean War ended by the time he graduated.

Powers was then assigned to the 468th Strategic Fighter Squadron at Turner Air Force Base, Georgia, as a Republic F-84 Thunderjet pilot. In October 1953, Powers was trained at Sandia Base in loading and dropping nuclear weapons from fighter aircraft, and in July 1954, was promoted to first lieutenant. Powers hoped to become a commercial airline pilot when his enlistment ended in December 1955, but decided to stay in the Air Force when he discovered he was, at the age of 26-and-a-half, at the age limit for commercial training.

== U-2 incident ==
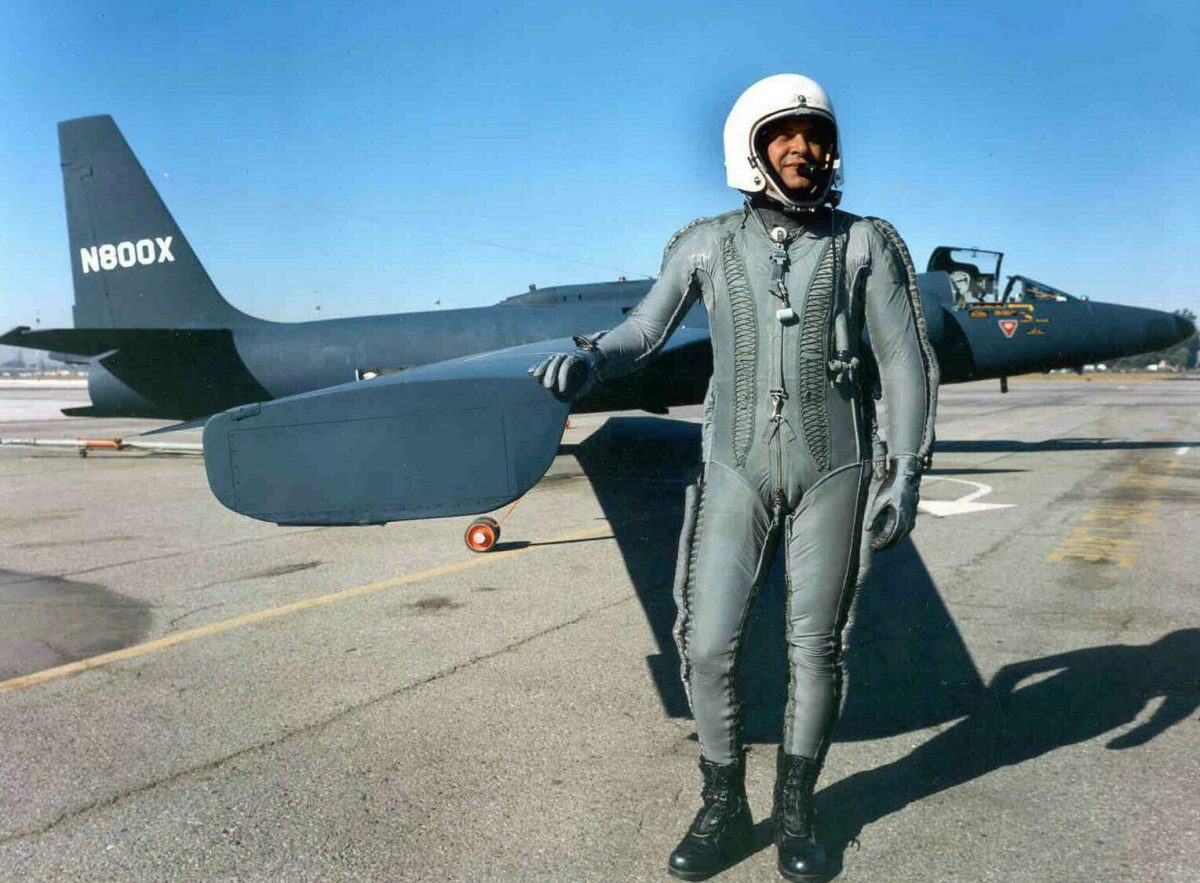
Powers next to a U-2

In January 1956, Powers was recruited by the CIA, and on May 13, 1956, he was discharged from the Air Force at the rank of captain, becoming a civilian employee of the CIA with the grade of GS-12.

In May 1956, Powers began U-2 training at Watertown Strip, Nevada. His training was complete by August 1956, and his unit, the Second Weather Observational Squadron (Provisional) or Detachment 10-10, was deployed to Incirlik Air Base in Turkey.

U-2 pilots flew espionage missions at altitudes above 70,000 feet (21 km), above the reach of Soviet air defenses until 1960. The U-2 was equipped with a state-of-the-art camera designed to take high-resolution photos from the stratosphere over hostile countries, including the Soviet Union. U-2 missions systematically photographed military installations and other important sites. By 1960, Powers was already a veteran of many covert aerial reconnaissance missions. Family members believed he was a NASA weather reconnaissance pilot.

=== Reconnaissance mission ===
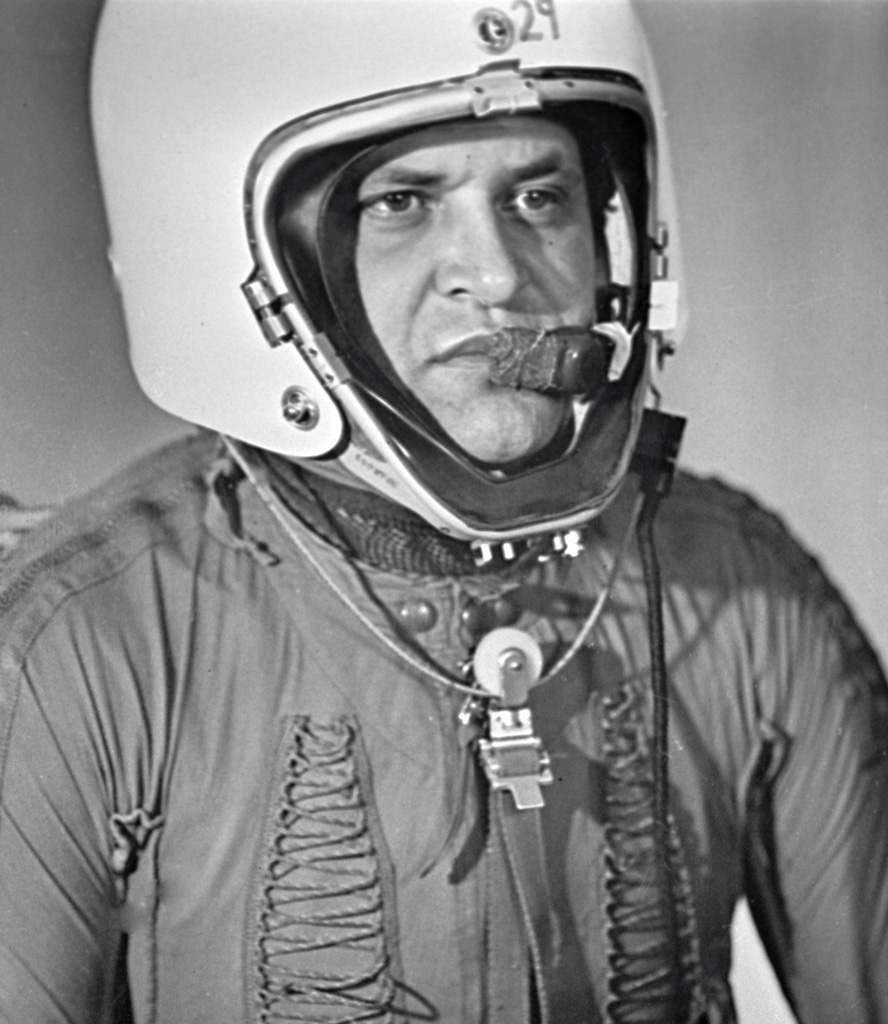
Powers in 1960, wearing his special pressure suit for stratospheric flying

The primary mission of the U-2s was to overfly the Soviet Union. Soviet intelligence had been aware of encroaching U-2 flights at least since 1958, if not earlier but lacked effective countermeasures until 1960. On May 1, 1960, Powers' U-2A, 56-6693, departed from a military airbase in Peshawar, Pakistan, with support from the U.S. Air Station at Badaber (Peshawar Air Station). This was to be the first attempt "to fly all the way across the Soviet Union," Powers wrote, "but it was considered worth the gamble. The planned route would take us deeper into Russia than we had ever gone, while traversing important targets never before photographed."

=== Shot down ===
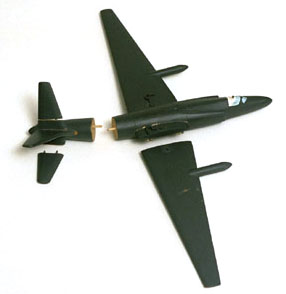
Wooden U-2 model used by Powers when he testified to the Senate Committee. The wings and tail are detached to demonstrate the aircraft's breakup.

On 1 May 1960, Powers was shot down by an S-75 Dvina (SA-2 "Guideline") surface-to-air missile over Sverdlovsk. A total of 14 missiles were launched, one of which hit a MiG-19 jet fighter that was sent to intercept the U-2 but could not reach a high enough altitude. Its pilot, Sergei Safronov, ejected but died of his injuries. Another Soviet aircraft, a newly manufactured Su-9 on a transit flight, also attempted to intercept Powers. The unarmed Su-9 was directed to ram the U-2 but missed because of the large differences in speed.

As Powers flew near Kosulino in the Ural region, three S-75 Dvinas were launched at his U-2, with the first one hitting the aircraft. "What was left of the plane began spinning, only upside down, the nose pointing upward toward the sky, the tail down toward the ground." According to his book Operation Overflight, Powers delayed activating the camera's self-destruct mechanism until he made sure he could exit the cockpit before the charges detonated. When g-forces unexpectedly threw him from the spinning aircraft, he could no longer reach the destruct switches. While descending under his parachute, Powers had time to scatter his escape map, and rid himself of part of his suicide device, a silver dollar coin suspended around his neck containing a poison-laced injection pin, though he kept the poison pin. "Yet I was still hopeful of escape." He hit the ground hard, and was immediately captured and taken to Lubyanka Prison in Moscow. Powers did note seeing a second chute after landing on the ground, "some distance away and very high, a lone red and white parachute".

=== Attempted deception by the U.S. government ===
When the U.S. government learned of Powers' disappearance over the Soviet Union, they lied that a "weather plane" had strayed off course after its pilot had "difficulties with his oxygen equipment". What CIA officials did not realize was that the plane crashed almost fully intact and that the Soviets had recovered its pilot and much of the plane's equipment, including its new top-secret high-altitude camera. Powers was interrogated extensively by the KGB for months before he made a confession and a public apology for his part in espionage.

=== Portrayal in U.S. media ===
Following admission by the White House that Powers had been captured alive, American media depicted Powers as an all-American pilot hero, who never smoked or touched alcohol. In fact, Powers smoked and drank socially. The CIA urged that his wife Barbara be given sedatives before speaking to the press and gave her talking points that she repeated to the press to portray her as a devoted wife. Her broken leg, according to the CIA disinformation, was the result of a water-skiing accident, when in fact it happened after she had had too much to drink and was dancing with another man.

In the course of his trial for espionage in the Soviet Union, Powers confessed to the charges against him and apologized for violating Soviet airspace to spy on the Soviets. In the wake of his apology, American media often depicted Powers as a coward and even as a symptom of the decay of the United States' "moral character."

=== Pilot testimony compromised by newspaper reports ===
Powers tried to limit the information he shared with the KGB to that which could be determined from the remains of his plane's wreckage. He was hampered by information appearing in the western press. A KGB major stated "There's no reason for you to withhold information. We'll find it out anyway. Your Press will give it to us." However, he limited his divulging of CIA contacts to one individual, with a pseudonym of "Collins". At the same time, he repeatedly stated the maximum altitude for the U-2 was 68,000 feet (21 km), lower than its actual flight ceiling.

During the trial, Powers' defense attorney focused on portraying him as the humble son of a coal mining family who had joined the U-2 program to make money, and shared a photograph of the family's farm. Powers testified to the court on how the Adana, Turkey, U-2 group was organized under Col. William Shelton and that the base was visited by high-profile military leaders, including Generals Thomas D. White and Frank F. Everest. He also described prior U-2 flights taken from Adana to Norway, skirting the border of the Soviet Union. The Soviet Union took great lengths to accommodate the press during the trial, providing translation in four languages, and the trial was also attended by the daughter of Nikita Khrushchev.

=== Political consequence ===
The incident set back talks between Khrushchev and Eisenhower. Powers' interrogations ended on June 30, and his solitary confinement ended on July 9. On August 17, 1960, his trial began for espionage before the Military Collegium of the Supreme Court of the Soviet Union. Lieutenant General Borisoglebsky, Major General Vorobyev, and Major General Zakharov presided. Roman Rudenko acted as prosecutor in his capacity of Procurator General of the Soviet Union. Mikhail I. Grinev served as Powers' defense counsel in the trial. In attendance were his parents and sister, and his wife Barbara and her mother. His father brought along his attorney Carl McAfee, while the CIA provided two additional attorneys.

=== Conviction ===
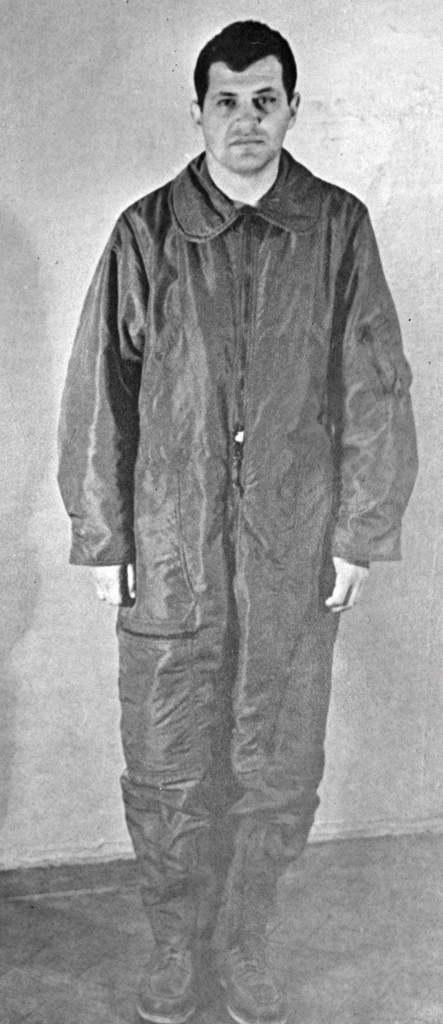
Powers while he was in Soviet custody

On August 19, 1960, Powers was convicted of espionage, "a grave crime covered by Article 2 of the Soviet Union's law 'On Criminality Responsibility for State Crimes'". His sentence consisted of 10 years' confinement, three of which were to be in a prison, with the remainder in a labor camp. The US Embassy "News Bulletin" stated, according to Powers, "as far as the government was concerned, I had acted in accordance with the instructions given [to] me and would receive my full salary while imprisoned".

He was held in Vladimir Central Prison, about 150 miles (240 km) east of Moscow, in building number 2 from September 9, 1960, until February 8, 1962. His cellmate was Zigurds Krūmiņš, a Latvian political prisoner. Powers kept a diary and a journal while confined. Additionally, he learned carpet weaving from his cellmate to pass the time. He could send and receive a limited number of letters to and from his family. The prison now contains a small museum with an exhibit on Powers, who allegedly developed a good rapport with Soviet prisoners there. Some pieces of the plane and Powers's uniform are on display at the Monino Airbase museum near Moscow.

=== Prisoner exchange ===
==== CIA opposition to exchange ====
The CIA, in particular chief of CIA Counterintelligence James Jesus Angleton, opposed exchanging Powers for Soviet KGB Colonel William Fisher, known as "Rudolf Abel", who had been caught by the FBI in the Hollow Nickel Case and tried and jailed for espionage. First, Angleton believed that Powers might have deliberately defected to the Soviet side. CIA documents released in 2010 indicate that U.S. officials did not believe Powers's account of the incident at the time, because it was contradicted by a classified National Security Agency (NSA) report which alleged that the U-2 had descended from 65,000 to 34,000 feet (20 to 10 km) before changing course and disappearing from radar. The NSA report remained classified as of 2022.

However, Barbara Powers, Gary's wife, was allegedly often drinking and having affairs. On June 22, 1961, she was pulled over by the police after driving erratically and was caught driving under the influence. To avoid bad publicity for the wife of the well-known CIA operative, doctors tasked by the CIA to keep Barbara out of the limelight arranged to have her committed to a psychiatric ward in Augusta, Georgia, under strict supervision. She was eventually released to the care of her mother. However, the CIA feared that Gary Powers, languishing in Soviet prison, might learn of Barbara's plight and, as a result, reach a state of desperation, causing him to reveal to the Soviets whatever secrets he had not already revealed. Thus, Barbara unwittingly may have aided the cause of the approval of the prisoner exchange involving her husband and William Fisher. Angleton and others at the CIA still opposed the exchange but President John F. Kennedy approved it.

==== The exchange ====
On February 10, 1962, Powers was exchanged, along with U.S. student Frederic Pryor, for Soviet KGB Colonel Rudolf Abel. Due to political differences between the Soviet Union and East Germany at the time, Pryor was turned over to American authorities in West Berlin at Checkpoint Charlie, before the exchange of Powers for Abel was allowed to proceed on the Glienicke Bridge.

Powers credited his father with the swap idea. When released, Powers' total time in captivity was 1 year, 9 months, and 10 days.

== Aftermath ==
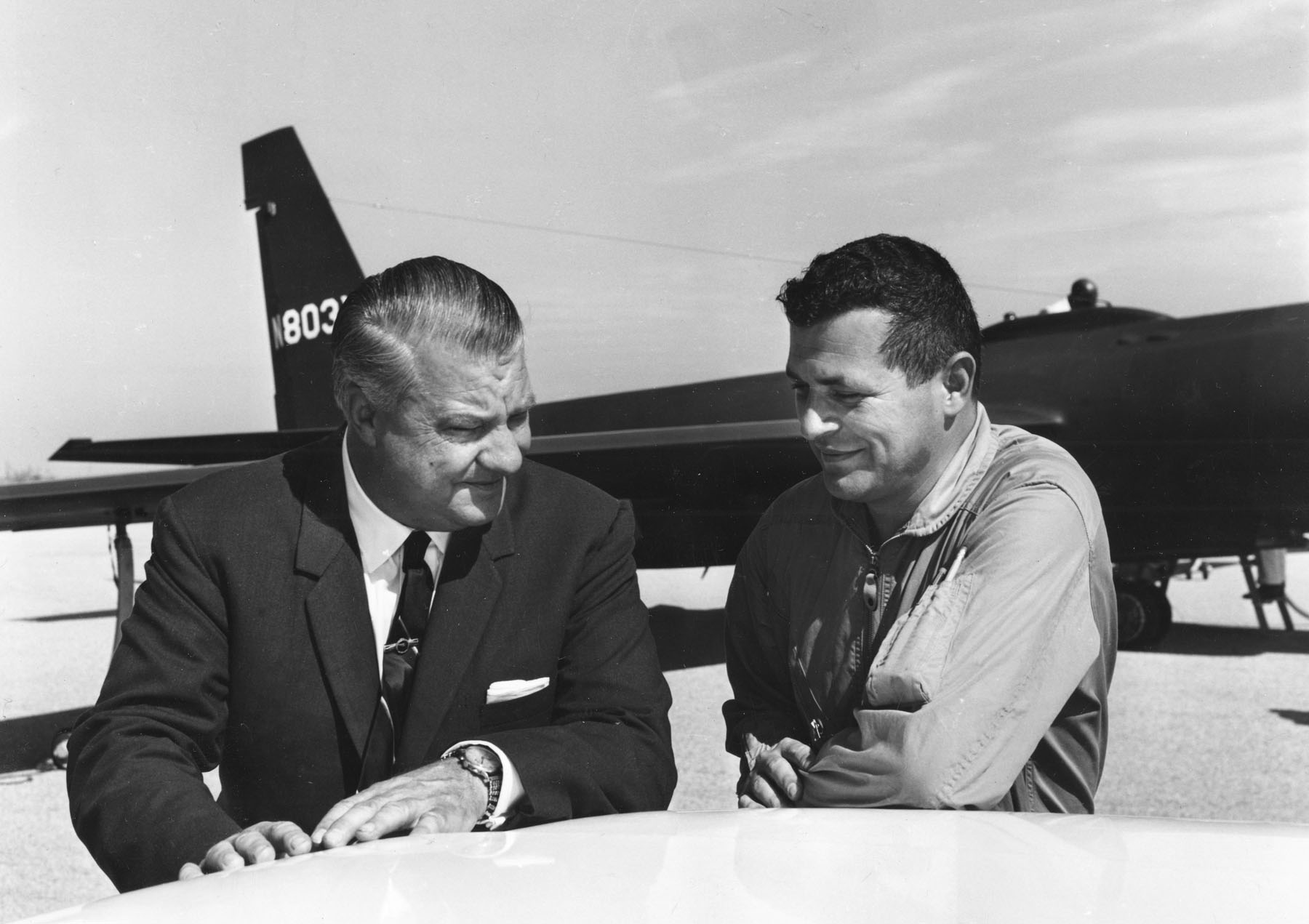
Clarence Johnson and Francis Gary Powers in front of a U-2

Powers initially received a cold reception on his return home. He was criticized for not activating his aircraft's self-destruct charge to destroy the camera, photographic film, and related classified parts. He was also criticized for not using an optional CIA-issued "suicide pin" to kill himself. Powers wore a hollowed-out silver dollar on a chain around his neck that disguised within it a grooved needle embedded with deadly shellfish toxin designed to kill by pricking the skin. Powers decided against doing so.

He was debriefed extensively by the CIA, Lockheed Corporation, and the Air Force, after which a statement was issued by CIA director John McCone that "Mr. Powers lived up to the terms of his employment and instructions in connection with his mission and in his obligations as an American." On March 6, 1962, he appeared before a Senate Armed Services Select Committee hearing chaired by Senator Richard Russell Jr. which included Senators Prescott Bush, Leverett Saltonstall, Robert Byrd, Margaret Chase Smith, John Stennis, Strom Thurmond, and Barry Goldwater. During the hearing, Senator Saltonstall stated, "I commend you as a courageous, fine young American citizen who lived up to your instructions and who did the best you could under very difficult circumstances." Senator Bush declared, "I am satisfied he has conducted himself in exemplary fashion and in accordance with the highest traditions of service to one's country, and I congratulate him upon his conduct in captivity." Senator Goldwater sent him a handwritten note: "You did a good job for your country." In a March 1964 speech, former CIA Director Allen Dulles said of Powers, "He performed his duty in a very dangerous mission and he performed it well, and I think I know more about that than some of his detractors and critics know, and I am glad to say that to him tonight."

Powers officially resigned from the CIA on October 6, 1962. In Operation Overflight, Powers wrote that upon joining the CIA in 1956, he had cosigned a document with Secretary of the Air Force Donald A. Quarles, guaranteeing Powers could return to the Air Force at his previous rank after his CIA service ended, with his CIA service time credited toward his Air Force retirement. He wrote that the CIA kept the sole copy of this document, and that upon his return from captivity in the USSR, his six-and-a-half years of CIA service time was not honored because of the bad publicity of the U-2 incident, and was a major factor in his decision not to rejoin the Air Force.

=== Divorce and remarriage ===
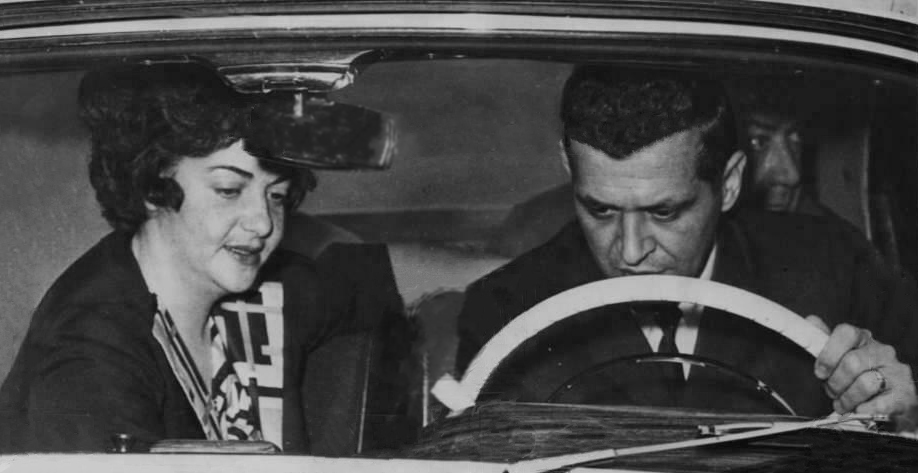
Powers with first wife, Barbara, in 1962

Powers married Barbara Gay Moore in Newnan, Georgia, on April 2, 1955. Their marriage was rocky, and Powers filed for divorce on August 14, 1962, citing Barbara's infidelity and alcoholism.

In January 1963, a jury in Milledgeville, Georgia, granted the divorce, awarding Barbara a $5,000 lump settlement (equivalent to $53,000 in 2025) and $500 for lawyer fees. Powers testified that while in captivity, he sometimes went as long as 45 days without a letter from her and "the only persons who ever mistreated me while I was in prison in Russia, was my wife, Barbara." Barbara countered that she suffered "just as much as Gary did when he was in prison" and that he returned a changed man "void of all feeling" except bitterness toward her.

Powers married Claudia Edwards "Sue" Downey, whom he had met at CIA Headquarters, on October 26, 1963. Powers adopted Downey's daughter from a previous marriage, Claudia Dee. Their son Francis Gary Powers Jr. was born on June 5, 1965. The marriage proved to be a happy one and Sue worked hard to preserve her husband's legacy after his death.

=== Later career ===
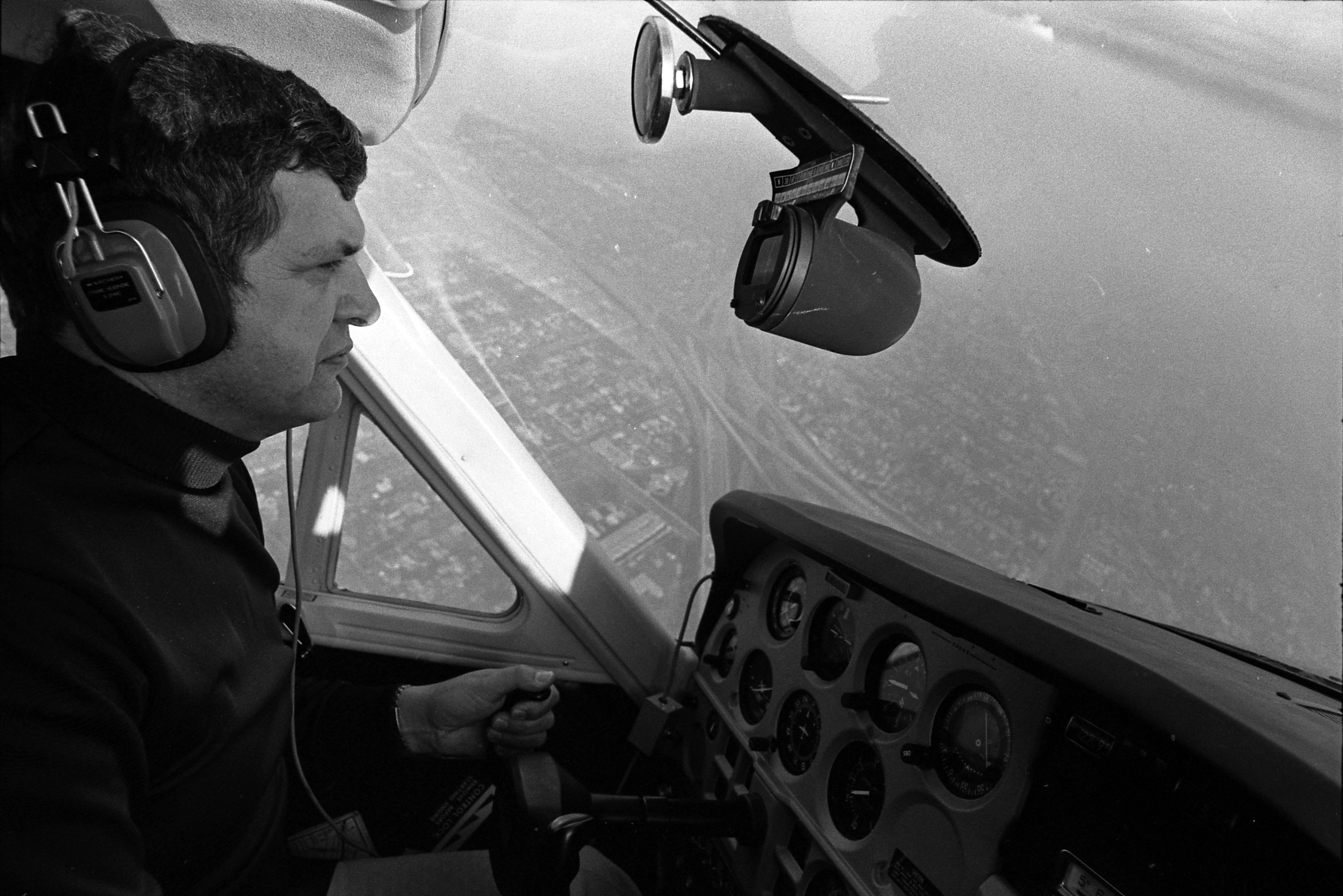
Powers in 1973, reporting for KGIL

Powers worked for Lockheed as a test pilot from 1962 to 1970, though the CIA paid his salary. In 1970, he co-wrote the book Operation Overflight: A Memoir of the U-2 Incident with Curt Gentry; this resulted in Lockheed firing him because "the book's publication had ruffled some feathers at Langley."

Powers struggled to find employment after being laid off from Lockheed, which he attributed to his tarnished reputation from the U-2 incident. He was eventually able to find work as a traffic reporting airplane pilot for Los Angeles radio station KGIL. In November 1976, he was hired as a helicopter news reporter for KNBC television.

== Death ==
Powers was piloting a Bell 206 JetRanger helicopter for Los Angeles TV station KNBC Channel 4 over the San Fernando Valley on August 1, 1977. The duo had been recording video after brush fires in Santa Barbara County and were heading back to Burbank Airport. The aircraft ran out of fuel and crashed at the Sepulveda Dam recreational area in Encino, California, several miles short of the airport. It is surmised that, at the last moment, he noticed children playing in the area and directed the helicopter elsewhere to avoid landing on them. He might have landed safely if not for the last-second deviation, which compromised his autorotative descent.

The National Transportation Safety Board report stated that pilot error probably caused the crash. Powers' son later said that an aviation mechanic had repaired a faulty fuel gauge without informing Powers, who subsequently misread it.

As an eligible Air Force veteran, Powers was buried in Arlington National Cemetery.

== Legacy ==
Powers' son, Francis Gary Powers Jr., founded the Cold War Museum in 1996. Originally affiliated with the Smithsonian Institution, it began as a traveling exhibit on the U-2 Incident until it found a permanent home at a former Army communications base in Warrenton, Virginia, in 2011.

In the 2015 film Bridge of Spies, which dramatized the negotiations to repatriate him, Powers is portrayed by Austin Stowell, with Tom Hanks starring as negotiator James B. Donovan.

== Decorations ==

1st row	Silver Star		Distinguished Flying Cross
2nd row	Prisoner of War Medal	National Defense Service Medal	Intelligence Star

Powers was awarded the CIA's Intelligence Star on April 20, 1965. On May 1, 2000, he was posthumously awarded the Distinguished Flying Cross, the Prisoner of War Medal, the National Defense Service Medal, and the CIA Director's Award. On June 15, 2012, he was also awarded the Silver Star for demonstrating "exceptional loyalty" while enduring nearly two years of harsh interrogation and imprisonment in Moscow. Air Force Chief of Staff General Norton Schwartz presented the decoration to Powers' grandchildren, Trey Powers and Lindsey Berry, in ceremony at the Pentagon.

== See also ==
- Rudolf Anderson
- Cuban Missile Crisis
