= Vox =

Vox may refer to:

== Arts, entertainment and media ==
=== Fictional characters ===
- Vox (DC Comics) (Mal Duncan), a DC Comics superhero
- Vox (Hazbin Hotel), a character in the adult animated series Hazbin Hotel
- Vox, several characters in the anime series Lagrange: The Flower of Rin-ne
- Gleeman Vox, from the Ratchet & Clank video game series

=== Literature ===
- Vox (Nicholson Baker novel), 1992
- Vox (Stewart and Riddell novel), 2003

=== Music ===
- "Vox" (song), by Sarah McLachlan, 1988
- Vox Records (Germany), a German record label
- Vox Records, an American record label
- Vox (band), Polish pop band founded in 1978

=== Television and radio ===
- VOX (Norwegian TV channel)
- VOX (German TV channel)
- MAtv, formerly Vox, a Canadian TV channel
- Vox (XM), a former XM satellite radio channel
- Radio Vox T, a Romanian radio station
- WVOX, a radio station licensed to New Rochelle, New York, U.S.
- "Võx", an episode of the third season of Star Trek: Picard
- VoxTalk, also known as Vox, a Canadian youth show from TVOntario

=== Media ===
- Vox Media, an American digital media company
  - Vox (website), an American news and opinion website
- Vox (magazine), a defunct British music tabloid
- Vox Magazine, produced by the Columbia Missourian

=== Other uses in arts, entertainment and media ===
- Vox (video game), 2012
- Electro-Vox Recording Studios, or Vox, a recording studio in Hollywood, California

== Businesses and organisations ==
- Vox (company), a British musical equipment manufacturer best known for its guitar amplifiers
- Vox (political party), in Spain
- Vox Telecom, South African ISP

== People ==
- Maximilien Vox (1894–1974), French writer, cartoonist, illustrator, publisher, journalist, art theorist and historian of the French letter and typography
- Victoria Vox (Victoria Davitt, born 1978), American singer and ukulele player
- Vox Day (Theodore Robert Beale, born 1968), American activist
- Mark Burgess (musician), English singer and musician who also uses the name Vox

== Science and technology ==
- Vox (blogging platform)
- VOX (file format), or Dialogic ADPCM, an audio file format
- HTC Vox, or HTC S710, a mobile phone
- Voice-operated switch

== Other uses ==
- Vox (vodka), a Dutch vodka
- Vox-ATypI classification, in typography
- HMS Vox, two submarines of the Royal Navy
- Dudek Vox, a Polish paraglider
- Vox, the Latin word for "voice"

== See also ==
- Vox Dei (disambiguation)
- Vox humana (disambiguation)
- Vox populi (disambiguation)
- Ultravox (disambiguation)
- Voxx (disambiguation)
