= List of miscellaneous fake news websites =

This is a list of miscellaneous fake news websites that do not fit into any of the other fake news website lists such as these lists of:

- fake news website campaigns by individuals,
- corporate disinformation website campaigns,
- fraudulent fact-checking websites,
- fake news websites based on generative AI
- hate group-sponsored fake news websites,
- elsewhere,
- satirical fake news websites,
- troll farm websites involved in fake news,
- user-generated fake news websites, and
- other fake news online networks.

== List ==
| Name | Domain | Status | Notes | Sources |
|---|---|---|---|---|
| 24online.news | 24online.news | | Impostor site, per PolitiFact. | |
| 24usainfo.com | 24usainfo.com | | | |
| 24x365live.com | 24x365live.com | | Per PolitiFact. | |
| 365 US News | 365usnews.com | | Per FactCheck.org. | |
| 7 News Political | 7newspolitical.site | | Per FactCheck.org. | |
| 70 News | 70news.wordpress.com | | A WordPress-hosted site that published a false news story, stating that Donald Trump had won the popular vote in the 2016 United States presidential election; the fake story rose to the top in searches for "final election results" on Google News. | |
| A Folha Brasil | | | Spoof of Folha de S.Paulo. | |
| Afrikan-daily.com | Afrikan-daily.com | | Spoof of the African Daily Voice. | |
| AfricaZilla | africazilla.com | | Impostor site that plagiarizes CNBC stories. | |
| aldipest.com | aldipest.com | | | |
| America Fans | Americafans.com | | Per FactCheck.org. | |
| americanflare.com | americanflare.com | | | |
| AmericanFlavor.news | AmericanFlavor.news | | Per PolitiFact. | |
| AmericanPoliticNews.co | AmericanPoliticNews.co | | Per PolitiFact. | |
| American Journal Review | Americanjournalreview.com | | Per FactCheck.org. | |
| American News (Anews-24.com) | Anews-24.com | | Per FactCheck.org and PolitiFact. Published the same story as Daily Feed News. Copied story from The Last Line of Defense. | |
| The American News | Theamericanews.co | | Per FactCheck.org. | |
| American Pride | Americanprides.com | | Per FactCheck.org. | |
| American Reviewer | americanreviewer.com | | Falsely claimed that Donald Trump made an announcement as president on or around November 14, 2016, two months prior to inauguration. | |
| American Today | americantoday.us | | Per PolitiFact. Falsely claimed that Barron Trump was hospitalized for pneumonia. Manipulated and misattributed celebrity quote. | |
| americasnewest.com | americasnewest.com | | | |
| ANews24.org | ANews24.org | | Per PolitiFact. | |
| The Angry Patriot | AngryPatriotMovement.com | | Per PolitiFact. | |
| Anonjekloy.tk | Anonjekloy.tk | | Per PolitiFact. | |
| AntiNews.com | AntiNews.com | | Per PolitiFact. | |
| Anti News Network | unseen-pedia.com | | Spread false claims about government-incentivized microchipping. | |
| Are You Asleep | areyouasleep.com | | | |
| ArmyUSANews.com | ArmyUSANews.com | | Per PolitiFact. Reposted story from the Last Line of Defense. | |
| Astronomy-Physics.com | Astronomy-Physics.com | | Falsely claimed that the Perseid meteor shower of 2017 would be "the brightest ... in recorded human history." | |
| Attitude.co.uk | Attitude.co.uk | | Per PolitiFact. | |
| Aurora-News.us | Aurora-News.us | | Impostor site, per PolitiFact. | |
| theavocadonews.com | theavocadonews.com | | | |
| Awareness Act | AwarenessAct.com | | Per PolitiFact. | |
| baldwinpost.com | baldwinpost.com | | | |
| Bar Exam News | barexam.news | | AI-fabricated news updates. Example: "California Law Schools Achieve Perfect First-Time Pass Rates in July Bar" posted 8/16/26; Actual results not released until 10/30/26 | |
| Barracuda Brigade | BB4SP.com | | Per PolitiFact. | |
| bbc.org.sa.com | bbc.org.sa.com | | Spoof of BBC. | |
| Before It's News | beforeitsnews.com | | Before It's News and InfoWars were described as "unabashedly unhinged 'news' sites" in 2014 by The Washington Post following its promotion of conspiracy theories relating to Malaysia Airlines Flight 17. Owned by Chris Kitze, who is also on the executive board of the Epoch Times. | |
| BenjaminFulford.typepad.com | BenjaminFulford.typepad.com | | Per PolitiFact. | |
| BestThings.us | BestThings.us | | Per PolitiFact. Spread a fabricated celebrity quote that originated from a Facebook page. | |
| betshort.com | betshort.com | | | |
| Big Blue Vision | bigbluevision.org | | | |
| Big Nugget News | bignuggetnews.com | | | |
| Biohackinfo | BioHackInfo.com | | Spread COVID-19 vaccine conspiracy theories. | |
| Bioreports.net | bioreports.net | | Impostor site that plagiarizes CNBC stories. | |
| Bipartisan Report | bipartisanreport.com | | Once describing itself at "the internet's largest newspaper", its content is written from a heavily liberal-biased perspective. It has been described as a clickbait and fake news website by Danny Westneat of The Seattle Times, and its articles have been debunked by PolitiFact and Snopes. | |
| bistonglobe.com | bistonglobe.com | | Imitates The Boston Globe. | |
| BlackInsuranceNews.com | BlackInsuranceNews.com | | Per PolitiFact. Reposted article from satirical site FreeWoodPost.com, without satirical disclaimer. | |
| BlingNews.com | BlingNews.com | | Per FactCheck.org. | |
| Bloomberg.market | Bloomberg.market | Defunct | Designed to imitate Bloomberg.com. Was used to issue a false report announcing that Twitter had received a US$31 billion takeover offer, resulting in a brief 8% stock price spike of Twitter. The site is now defunct. | |
| BlueLineStrong.net | BlueLineStrong.net | | Per PolitiFact. Repurposed an Associated Press article with a false headline. | |
| Blue Vision Post | Bluevisionpost.com | | Per FactCheck.org and PolitiFact. | |
| bollywoodmasaladay.xyz | bollywoodmasaladay.xyz | | Published false quotes from celebrities. | |
| borntoberight.com | borntoberight.com | | Falsely claimed that Kathy Griffin was jailed in 2017. | |
| BreakingNewsBlast.com | BreakingNewsBlast.com | | Per PolitiFact. | |
| thebreakingnews.today | thebreakingnews.today | | Has the same IP address as conservativedaily.info | |
| Breaking Top | Breakingtop.world | | Per FactCheck.org and PolitiFact. | |
| Brexit Betrayal News | | | Registered in the United States. Posted stories about QAnon. | |
| Buffalo Chronicle | buffalochronicle.com | | An American fake news website that has promoted fake stories related to Canadian politics. | |
| But That's None Of My Business | butthatsnoneofmybusiness.com | | Described by Snopes and Lead Stories as "hoax" sites. | |
| BuzzBeed | buzzbeed.com | | Not to be confused with BuzzFeed. Part of a network created by far-right activists in France. | |
| Cairns News (Australia) | cairnsnews.org | | Anti-vaccine website that falsely claimed that two young girls died after receiving a COVID-19 vaccination on the Gold Coast, Australia. | |
| CannaSOS | CannaSOS.com | | Per PolitiFact. | |
| CelebSaga | celebsaga.com | | Reposted a false story from Conservative Beaver. | |
| chicagotribunesnews.com | chicagotribunesnews.com | | Imitates the Chicago Tribune. | |
| choiceandtruth.com | choiceandtruth.com | | | |
| ChristianTimesNewspaper.com | ChristianTimesNewspaper.com | | Impostor site for Christian Times. Falsely claimed voter fraud on behalf of Hillary Clinton. Owned by an aide to David E. Vogt III, whom was let go upon disclosure of the ownership by The New York Times. | |
| ChristianToday.info | ChristianToday.info | | Per PolitiFact. | |
| chuckcallesto.blogspot.com | chuckcallesto.blogspot.com | | | |
| Clear Politics | clear-politics.com | | Per FactCheck.org. | |
| clubsocial-ny.com | clubsocial-ny.com | | Has the same IP address as conservativedaily.info | |
| CNewsGo.com | CNewsGo.com | | Per PolitiFact. | |
| CNN-Business-News.ga | CNN-Business-News.ga | | Impostor site of CNN. | |
| CNNews3.com | CNNews3.com | | Impostor site of CNN. Ran false story about HIV infection from bananas. | |
| COED | coed.com | | Falsely claimed a Black Lives Matter protest at Dartmouth College in 2015 turned violent. | |
| CoffeeBreakForYou.com | CoffeeBreakForYou.com | | Per PolitiFact. | |
| Consciously Enlightened | consciouslyenlightened.com | | | |
| Conservative7.com | Conservative7.com | | Per PolitiFact. | |
| conservativedaily.info | conservativedaily.info | | | |
| conservativefighter.com | conservativefighter.com | | Spread false story about Trump removing a federal judge. | |
| conservativeinsider.co | conservativeinsider.co | | | |
| theconservativeonline.info | theconservativeonline.info | | Has the same Google AdSense account as conservativedaily.info | |
| conservativeonline.net | conservativeonline.net | | Has the same Google AdSense account as conservativedaily.info | |
| ConservativeSpirit.com | ConservativeSpirit.com | | Per PolitiFact. | |
| conservativestudio.com | conservativestudio.com | | | |
| ConservativeView.info | ConservativeView.info | | Per PolitiFact. | |
| Conservative Angle | Conservativeangle.com | | Per FactCheck.org. | |
| Conservative Nation | Consnation.com | | Per FactCheck.org. Copied story from The Last Line of Defense. | |
| Conservative Post | Conservativepost.com | | Per FactCheck.org. | |
| The Conservative Treehouse | Theconservativetreehouse.com | | Per FactCheck.org and PolitiFact. In 2020, it promoted a conspiracy theory that Buffalo police shoving incident victim Martin Gugino was a member of Antifa, which was tweeted out by then-U.S. president Donald Trump. | |
| Consinfo | consinfo.us | | Per FactCheck.org. Copied story from The Last Line of Defense. | |
| cooltobeconservative.com | cooltobeconservative.com | | | |
| cosonline.cn | cosonline.cn | | Impostor site, per DomainTools. | |
| Cyceon | Cyceon.com | | Spread false claim about Emmanuel Macron's tax policy proposal during the 2017 French Presidential Election. | |
| Daily Feed News | dailyfeed.news | | Per FactCheck.org and PolitiFact. Copied story from The Last Line of Defense. | |
| dailynews3.com | dailynews3.com | | | |
| dailynews33.com | dailynews33.com | | | |
| Daily Occupation | dailyoccupation.com | | | |
| The Daily Presser | dailypresser.com | | Reposted false story from Your News Wire about Clinton body count conspiracy theory. | |
| DailyThings.world | DailyThings.world | | Per PolitiFact. | |
| Daily Insider News | Dailyinsidernews.com | | Per FactCheck.org. Copied story from The Last Line of Defense. | |
| DamnLeaks.com | DamnLeaks.com | | Per PolitiFact. | |
| DefenseUsa.club | DefenseUsa.club | | Per PolitiFact. | |
| DemocraticMoms.com | DemocraticMoms.com | | Per PolitiFact. Copied story from Politicalo.com. | |
| DemocraticUnderground.com | democraticmnderground.com | | Per PolitiFact. | |
| DepartedMedia.com | departedmedia.com | | Per PolitiFact. Published false stories with fabricated images. | |
| Diário do Brasil | diariodobrasil.org | | Imposter news portal site in Brazil. | |
| DisabledVeterans.org | disabledveterans.org | | Spread misinformation about vaccines and COVID-19. | |
| Disclose.tv | disclose.tv | | A German disinformation outlet that started out as a UFO conspiracy forum before rebranding as a news aggregator in 2021. It pushes far-right content, anti-vaccine narratives and conspiracy theories, and platforms hate speech, including Holocaust denial and neo-Nazism, on its message groups. | |
| DIYHours.net | DIYHours.net | | Per PolitiFact. | |
| donaldtrumpdaily.info | donaldtrumpdaily.info | | Has the same Google AdSense account as conservativedaily.info | |
| donaldtrumpliedto.us | donaldtrumpliedto.us | | | |
| DonaldTrumpPOTUS45.com | DonaldTrumpPOTUS45.com | | Per PolitiFact. | |
| Embols | embols.com | | | |
| Empire Herald | empireherald.com | | Starting in January 2016, this fake news site had spread many of its hoaxes online in just a few weeks. Cited story from World News Daily Report. | |
| ENH | ENHLive.com | | Per PolitiFact. Copied false story from the Boston Tribune. | |
| enVolve | En-volve.com | | Per FactCheck.org and PolitiFact. | |
| Every News Here | everynewshere.com | | | |
| Evie Magazine | eviemagazine.com | Active | Described by Futurism as "an alt-right women's lifestyle publication" that posts "a range of bizarre and often harmful content including vaccine misinformation, a bevy of wildly unscientific assertions about women's health, anti-trans fearmongering, unsupported 'psyop' conspiracies, and pro-life messaging that often includes false claims about safe and effective abortion drugs." Noted by VICE to spread COVID-19 misinformation and the QAnon conspiracy theory. Cited by the Washington Post as an example of "prominent conservative commentators ... sowing misinformation as a way to discourage the use of birth control." | |
| The Exposé | expose-news.com | | British conspiracist website known for publishing COVID-19 and anti-vaccine misinformation. One of its articles was cited by Brazilian president Jair Bolsonaro in a speech falsely claiming that people vaccinated against COVID-19 were developing AIDS. Copied a false story from The People's Voice. | |
| The Exposé | dailyexpose.uk | | URL variation. | |
| FactRider.com | FactRider.com | | Per PolitiFact. | |
| Famous Viral Stories | famousviralstories.com | | | |
| FanMagazine.it | FanMagazine.it | | Spread false claims about cures for COVID-19. | |
| fanzinger.com | fanzinger.com | | | |
| The Federalist Nation | Federalistnation.com | | Per FactCheck.org. Copied story from The Last Line of Defense. | |
| The Federalist Tribune | federalisttribune.com | | Per FactCheck.org and PolitiFact. | |
| Fellowship of the Minds | Fellowshipoftheminds.com | | Per FactCheck.org. | |
| Firstpost | FirstPost.com | | Per PolitiFact. Includes "a 'Faking News' section full of intentionally bogus content 'to attract your attention.'" | |
| Flash News Corner | Flashnewscorner.com | | Per FactCheck.org and PolitiFact. | |
| Flopping Aces | floppingaces.net | | Involved in the Jamil Hussein controversy. | |
| FocusNews.info | FocusNews.info | | Per PolitiFact. | |
| ForFreedomWorld.com | ForFreedomWorld.com | | Per PolitiFact. Copied story from The Last Line of Defense. | |
| FR24News.com | fr24news.com | | Impostor site that plagiarizes CNBC stories. | |
| freddymag.com | freddymag.com | | Fabricated story about Kendrick Lamar. | |
| FreedomsFinalStand.com | FreedomsFinalStand.com | | Per PolitiFact. Copied story from The Last Line of Defense. | |
| FreeInfoMedia.com | FreeInfoMedia.com | | Per PolitiFact. Copied story from The Last Line of Defense. | |
| Free Republic | FreeRepublic.com | | Per PolitiFact. | |
| friendsofsyria.wordpress.com | friendsofsyria.wordpress.com | | | |
| The Gateway Pundit | thegatewaypundit.com | | A far-right fake news website that repeatedly publishes false stories, including a story involving an unsubstantiated claim that Special Counsel head Robert Mueller sexually assaulted someone. | |
| GiveMeLiberty01.com | GiveMeLiberty01.com | | Per PolitiFact. | |
| Globalresearch.ca | Globalresearch.ca | | Principal website of the Centre for Research on Globalization, which The Economist in April 2017 called "a hub for conspiracy theories and fake stories," and NATO information warfare specialists in November 2017 linked to a concerted effort to undermine the credibility of mainstream Western media. | |
| The-Global-News.com | The-Global-News.com | | Per PolitiFact. | |
| good-kingnews.com | good-kingnews.com | | Plagiarized article by the Los Angeles Times. | |
| GOP The Daily Dose | GOPTheDailyDose.com | | Posted anti-Muslim stories and celebrity quotes taken out of context. | |
| Gossip Mill Mzansi | gossipmillsa.com | | A fake news website using Wordpress, targeting South African affairs. Its misinformation is spread on social media including Facebook and Twitter. | |
| GreatGameIndia Magazine | GreatGameIndia.com | | Spread COVID-19 vaccine misinformation. | |
| Greenville Gazette | greenvillegazette.com | | | |
| Gummy Post | gummypost.com | | Fake news website that has published claims about President Obama issuing a full pardon for convicted rapper C-Murder, musician Kodak Black getting shot outside a nightclub in Florida, and a Hulk Hogan death hoax. | |
| Hal Turner Show | halturnershow.com | | Operated by Hal Turner, who is described as an extremist and white supremacist by the Southern Poverty Law Center. | |
| HealthyCareAndBeauty.com | HealthyCareAndBeauty.com | | Per PolitiFact. | |
| Healthy Living Thread | healthylivingthread.com | | Falsely claimed that nearly 70% of olive oil brands in the USA had canola oil or sunflower oil. | |
| HeightPost.com | HeightPost.com | | Per PolitiFact. | |
| Higher Perspectives | HigherPerspectives.com | | Per PolitiFact. | |
| hoggwatch.us | hoggwatch.us | | | |
| The Honey Pot Times | thetrojanhoneypot.wordpress.com | | Impostor site set up by fact-checker to catch business2community.com plagiarizing their work. | |
| I Have The Truth | ihavethetruth.com | | Published false story claiming that a student carrying a concealed weapon helped stop a knife attack at the University of Texas Austin in 2017. | |
| IdeaSpots.com | IdeaSpots.com | | Per PolitiFact. | |
| Igor's Newsletter | igor-chudov.com | | Published anti-vaccine misinformation. | |
| iMzansi | imzansi.com | | Fake news website in South Africa, per Africa Check, an IFCN signatory. | |
| Independent Minute | IndependentMinute.com | | Per PolitiFact. | |
| IndiaTimes.com | IndiaTimes.com | | Per PolitiFact. | |
| InfoBrasil | infobrasil12.wordpress.com | | Brazilian WordPress-hosted site that published political fake stories and satires; had a YouTube channel which was mentioned in a 2019 report by O Estado de S. Paulo about fake news outlets that had government-related advertisements in them. | |
| instanthelp24.icu | instanthelp24.icu | | Published hoax on missing child. Flagged by Google as potential phishing site. | |
| InterestingDailyNews.com | InterestingDailyNews.com | | Per PolitiFact. | |
| The International Reporter | theinternationalreporter.org | | | |
| TheInternetPost.net | TheInternetPost.net | | Per PolitiFact. | |
| In Trend Today | intrendtoday.com | | | |
| IsThatLegit.com | IsThatLegit.com | | Per PolitiFact. Copied false story from BostonLeader.com with out-of-context imagery. | |
| Jews News | jewsnews.co.il | | Per PolitiFact. Reposted a false story from FrontPage Magazine. | |
| Judicial Watch | judicialwatch.org | | Conservative activist group known for making false and unsubstantiated claims and filing lawsuits to investigate claimed misconduct, the vast majority of which have been dismissed by courts. | |
| kata33.com | kata33.com | | | |
| KBC14.com | KBC14.com | | Impostor site, per PolitiFact | |
| ΚΒΟΙ2.com | ΚΒΟΙ2.com | | Notable for its use of the IDN homograph attack, this fake news site used lookalike letters from other scripts (news coverage of the spoof did not specify which, though the examples listed demonstrate Greek and Cyrillic examples) to spoof the legitimate television station KBOI-TV's website in 2011. (The real KBOI site has since moved to a new domain, IdahoNews.com.) The sole purpose of the fake KBOI site was to spread an April Fool's Day joke regarding Justin Bieber being banned in the state. | |
| KCST7.com | KCST7.com | | Impostor site, per PolitiFact | |
| KF13.com | KF13.com | | Impostor site, per PolitiFact | |
| klponews.com | klponews.com | | | |
| Konkonsagh.biz | Konkonsagh.biz | | Per PolitiFact. | |
| KRB7.com | KRB7.com | | Impostor site, per PolitiFact | |
| krbcnews.com | krbcnews.com | | | |
| krebsonsecurity.org | krebsonsecurity.org | | Imitates Krebs on Security. | |
| KTY24news.com | KTY24news.com | | Impostor site, per PolitiFact | |
| LadyLibertysNews.com | LadyLibertysNews.com | | Per PolitiFact. | |
| landrypost.com | landrypost.com | | | |
| lanuevaprensa.net | lanuevaprensa.net | | Spoof of La Nueva Prensa, a news website in Colombia. | |
| LastDeplorables.com | LastDeplorables.com | | Per PolitiFact. Copied story from The Last Line of Defense. | |
| Law Enforcement Today | lawenforcementtoday.com | | Published fake news about police relations amid the George Floyd protests and source of Oregon fires, as well as material by QAnon supporters. | |
| Lead Patriot | leadpatriot.com | | | |
| LearnProgress.org | LearnProgress.org | | Per PolitiFact. | |
| LiberalPlug.com | LiberalPlug.com | | Per PolitiFact. Fabricated a quote from a fictitious politician in the United States House of Representatives. | |
| Liberty-Courier.com | Liberty-Courier.com | | Per PolitiFact. Copied story from The Last Line of Defense. | |
| Liberty Writers News | LibertyWritersNews.com | | Established in 2015 by Paris Wade and Ben Goldman, who told The Washington Post their stories focus on "violence and chaos and aggressive wording" to attract readers. The stories reflect the positions of supporters of Donald Trump. A 2018 report by Buzzfeed News linked Wade and Goldman to a Macedonian media attorney who operated numerous "fake news" websites during the six month lead-up to the 2016 Presidential Election. As of 2018, the governments of the United States and "at least two Western European countries" were investigating a possible connection between the Macedonian fake news sites and the Internet Research Agency, as an IRA employee was known to visit North Macedonia in 2015. | |
| The Light | thelightpaper.co.uk | | Published misleading COVID vaccination claims. | |
| LinkBeef | linkbeef.com | | Fake news website that has published claims about the pilot of Malaysia Airlines Flight 370 reappearing, a billionaire wanting to recruit 1,000 women to bear his children, and an Adam Sandler death hoax. | |
| LiveMonitor | livemonitor.co.za | | Fake news website in South Africa, per Africa Check, an IFCN signatory. | |
| lockerdome.com | lockerdome.com | | Falsely claimed that Donald Trump made an announcement as president on or around November 14, 2016, two months prior to inauguration. | |
| London Web News | londonwebnews.com | | Per FactCheck.org and PolitiFact. | |
| losdanieles.net | losdanieles.net | | Spoof of Los Danieles. Same owner as lanuevaprensa.net. | |
| MadWorldNews.com | MadWorldNews.com | | Per PolitiFact. | |
| Maine Republic Email Alert | Mainerepublicemailalert.com | | Per FactCheck.org. Copied story from The Last Line of Defense. | |
| Major Thoughts | MajorThoughts.com | | Per PolitiFact. | |
| mangozhc.cc | mangozhc.cc | | Posted same story as WhatRegistrater.com. | |
| MBGA News | MBGAnews.com | | Brexit-related site that redirects to the Red Pill Factory, which was registered in the USA. | |
| MediaMaxZone.com | MediaMaxZone.com | | Per PolitiFact. | |
| mediazone.news | mediazone.news | | | |
| Mentor2day.com | Mentor2day.com | | Per PolitiFact. | |
| MetropolitanWorlds.com | MetropolitanWorlds.com | | Per PolitiFact. | |
| MMinfo24.com | MMinfo24.com | | Per FactCheck.org. | |
| TheMoralOfTheStory.us | TheMoralOfTheStory.us | | Per PolitiFact. | |
| Morning Herald | morning-herald.com | | Per FactCheck.org | |
| MSFanPage | msfanpage.link | | | |
| MSMBC.co | MSMBC.co | | Spoof of MSNBC. Falsely claimed that Steve Burns died in a car accident. | |
| msnbc.website | msnbc.website | | Spoof of MSNBC. | |
| MV-media (formerly MV-lehti) | mvlehti.org | | A Finnish fake news website that publishes disinformation, pseudoscience, conspiracy theories and Russian state propaganda. The publication has links to the far-right Soldiers of Odin. | |
| Mzansi LIVE | mzansilive.co.za | | Fake news website in South Africa, per Africa Check, an IFCN signatory. | |
| Mzansi Stories | mzansistories.com | | Fake news website in South Africa, per Africa Check, an IFCN signatory. | |
| Naha Daily | nahadaily.com | Defunct | This fake news website is now defunct, and was active in a span of five months with fake news articles, including a fake quote by Michael Kors. | |
| Nation.com.pk | Nation.com.pk | | Per PolitiFact. | |
| National Insider Politics | nationalinsiderpolitics.com | | | |
| TheNationalMarijuanaNews.com | TheNationalMarijuanaNews.com | | Per PolitiFact. | |
| NativeAmericans.us | NativeAmericans.us | | Per PolitiFact. | |
| nbcpoll.co | nbcpoll.co | | Falsely claimed that Donald Trump made an announcement as president on or around November 14, 2016, two months prior to inauguration. | |
| Nephef.com | Nephef.com | | Per PolitiFact. | |
| TheNet24h.com | TheNet24h.com | | Per PolitiFact. | |
| Nevo News | nevo.news | | Described by Snopes as a "clickbait web site". Accused by the ADL of inciting violence against Barack Obama. | |
| news14kgpn.com | news14kgpn.com | | | |
| news14now.com | news14now.com | | | |
| NewsBreakHere.com | NewsBreakHere.com | | Per PolitiFact. | |
| NewsBreakingsPipe.com | NewsBreakingsPipe.com | | Per PolitiFact. | |
| NewsBySquad.com | NewsBySquad.com | | Per PolitiFact. | |
| NewsConservative.com | NewsConservative.com | | Per PolitiFact. Copied story from The Last Line of Defense. | |
| newsdag.com | newsdag.com | | Impostor site, per DomainTools | |
| newsdaily10.com | newsdaily10.com | | | |
| NewsForMeToday.com | NewsForMeToday.com | | Per PolitiFact. Republished a hoax about worldwide blackout. | |
| NewsJustForYou1.blogspot.com | NewsJustForYou1.blogspot.com | | Per PolitiFact. | |
| newsmagazinehouse.co.uk | newsmagazinehouse.co.uk | | | |
| newsnow17.com | newsnow17.com | | | |
| NewsOfTrump.com | NewsOfTrump.com | | Per PolitiFact. | |
| NewsUpToday.com | NewsUpToday.com | | Per PolitiFact. | |
| newshubs.info | newshubs.info | | | |
| NewsWatch28 | newswatch28.com | | Previous alias for NewsWatch33. | |
| NewsWatch33 | newswatch33.com | | Began in April 2015 under the name NewsWatch28, later becoming NewsWatch33. The website disguises itself as a local television outlet. It has also been known to mix real news along with its fake news in an attempt to circumvent Facebook's crackdown on them. Republished a hoax about worldwide blackout. | |
| NewzMagazine.com | NewzMagazine.com | | Per PolitiFact. Part of an online scam network. | |
| NY Evening News | Nyeveningnews.com | | Per FactCheck.org. | |
| New York Times Post | nytimespost.com | | Impostor site that plagiarizes CNBC stories. | |
| NNettle.com | NNettle.com | | Per PolitiFact. | |
| now77news.com | now77news.com | | Spread false claim about Charles Manson being granted parole in 2017. | |
| NYC Post | nycpost.pro | | Impostor site of The New York Post. | |
| nydaiylnews.com | nydaiylnews.com | | Imitates The New York Daily News. | |
| nymeta.co | nymeta.co | | Per BuzzFeed News and the Associated Press. | |
| nytimesofficial.com | nytimesofficial.com | | Impostor site of The New York Times. | |
| ObserverOnline.news | ObserverOnline.news | | Impostor site, per PolitiFact | |
| ourthoughtsnprayers.com | ourthoughtsnprayers.com | | | |
| Palmer Report | palmerreport.com | | Hyperpartisan liberal political blog known for publishing unsubstantiated or false claims and conspiracy theories, especially on matters relating to Donald Trump and Russia | |
| Patriot Crier | PatriotCrier.com | | Per PolitiFact. | |
| Patriot Hangout | Patriothangout.com | | Per FactCheck.org. Copied article from The Rightists, a satire site. | |
| PatriotUSA.website | PatriotUSA.website | | Per PolitiFact. Copied story from The Last Line of Defense. | |
| patriotsontheright.com | patriotsontheright.com | | Falsely claimed that Kathy Griffin was jailed in 2017. | |
| Political Mayhem News | PoliticalMayhem.news | | Per PolitiFact. | |
| The Political Tribune | Thepoliticaltribune.com | | Per FactCheck.org. Copied story from The Last Line of Defense. | |
| Politics Video Channel | politicsvideochannel.com | | Per FactCheck.org and USA Today. | |
| PoliticsPaper.com | PoliticsPaper.com | | Per PolitiFact. Copied story from The Last Line of Defense. | |
| PoliticsUSANews.com | PoliticsUSANews.com | | Per PolitiFact. | |
| PositiveDaily.com | PositiveDaily.com | | Per PolitiFact. | |
| Postcard News | postcard.news | | Postcard News is an Indian far-right propaganda and news website. In 2019, its founder, Mahesh Hegde, was arrested for a second time on charges of spreading fake news. Repeatedly shared on social media by BJP leaders. | |
| Power Daily | Powerdaily.us | | Per FactCheck.org. | |
| President 45 Donald Trump | President45donaldtrump.com | | Per FactCheck.org and PolitiFact. | |
| Proud Patriots | wetheproudpatriots.com | | Per FactCheck.org and PolitiFact. | |
| Prntly | prntly.com | | A politically conservative news site described by Snopes as "a disreputable outlet that has a penchant for publishing both fake news and spurious pro-Trump articles". Copied story from Now 8 News. | |
| ProudLeader.com | ProudLeader.com | | Per PolitiFact. Copied story from The Last Line of Defense. | |
| Puppet String News | Puppetstringnews.com | | Per FactCheck.org and PolitiFact. | |
| RAIR Foundation USA | rairfoundation.com | | Spread anti-vaccine misinformation. | |
| therealconservative.info | therealconservative.info | | Has the same IP address as conservativedaily.info | |
| RealTrueNews | RealTrueNews.org | | Created as a hoax that the author believed would teach his alt-right friends about reader gullibility. | |
| RearFront.com | RearFront.com | | Per PolitiFact. | |
| Red Pill Factory | RedPillFactory.uk | | Published false/partisan claims related to immigration, the yellow vest movement and Brexit. | |
| RedRockTribune.com | RedRockTribune.com | | Impostor site, per PolitiFact | |
| Red State Watcher | RedStateWatcher.com | | A right-leaning news aggregator, the Washington Post supported the claim that the website's associated Facebook page may have had more user interactions than that of Donald Trump's personal Facebook page as of July 2016. Spread false claims against Hillary Clinton during the 2016 US presidential election, COVID-19 vaccine misinformation and the Pizzagate conspiracy theory. Posted an out-of-context video about Donald Trump and Sadiq Khan. Accused by the ADL of inciting violence against Barack Obama. | |
| ReflectionofMind.org | ReflectionofMind.org | | Per PolitiFact. Republished a hoax about worldwide blackout. | |
| ref-was-adv.sopq-net-q8.xyz | ref-was-adv.sopq-net-q8.xyz | | A site impersonating a Saudi news website | |
| ReligionMind.com | ReligionMind.com | | Per PolitiFact. Published a false story with an out-of-context image and a fabricated attribution to Human Rights Watch. Copied a story from World News Daily Report. | |
| The Reporterz | thereporterz.com | | Starting in early 2016, this fake news website penned several different hoaxes, including one about a murder over a Twitter trend. | |
| Revolutions2040.com | Revolutions2040.com | | Per PolitiFact. | |
| rickwells.us | rickwells.us | | | |
| rightforever.com | rightforever.com | | Falsely claimed that Donald Trump made an announcement as president on or around November 14, 2016, two months prior to inauguration. | |
| Rile News | rilenews.com | | | |
| Rogue-Nation3.com | Rogue-Nation3.com | | Per PolitiFact. | |
| TheRooster.com | TheRooster.com | | Per PolitiFact. | |
| RumorJournal.com | RumorJournal.com | | Per PolitiFact. Copied article from The Rightists, a satire site. | |
| Santa Monica Observer | smobserved.com | | Published false claims about Paul Pelosi in the aftermath of him being attacked in October 2022. | |
| saynotopot.us | saynotopot.us | | | |
| Slay News | slaynews.com | | This website has published claims such as that the World Economic Forum wants to use artificial intelligence to write a new bible. Copied a false story from The People's Voice. | |
| Smag31.com | Smag31.com | | Per PolitiFact. | |
| TheSmokersClub.com | TheSmokersClub.com | | Per PolitiFact. | |
| Snoopack | Snoopack.com | | Published a false story with an out-of-context image. Copied story from The Last Line of Defense. | |
| snopesisridiculo.us | snopesisridiculo.us | | | |
| SocialEverythings.com | SocialEverythings.com | | Per PolitiFact. | |
| The Solexchange | TheSolExchange.com | | Per PolitiFact. Copied a false story from CannaSOS. | |
| South Africa Latest News | southafricalatestnews.co.za | | Fake news website in South Africa, per Africa Check, an IFCN signatory. | |
| South Africa Uncut | southafricauncut.com | | Per Africa Check and News24. | |
| SouthernConservativeExtra.com | SouthernConservativeExtra.com | | Per PolitiFact. Copied an article from truetrumpers.com, a fake news site based in North Macedonia. | |
| sozcu.today | sozcu.today | | Spoof of Sözcü. | |
| Special News USA | SpecialNewsUSA.com | | Per FactCheck.org. | |
| Spinzon | spinzon.com | | | |
| statenation.co | statenation.co | | | |
| Stillness In The Storm | StillnessInTheStorm.com | | Per PolitiFact. | |
| Super Station 95 | SuperStation95.com | | Pirate radio station and corresponding website operated by Hal Turner, who is described as an extremist and white supremacist by the Southern Poverty Law Center. | |
| Supreme Patriot | SupremePatriot.com | | Per PolitiFact. | |
| TD Newswire | tdnewswire.com | | | |
| TDT Alliance | TDTAlliance.com | | Per PolitiFact. Impostor site of Fox News. Fabricated a story with quotes from fictitious persons. | |
| TeaParty.org (1776 Tea Party) | TeaParty.org | | Per PolitiFact. Published false story about Nancy Pelosi. Published stories from WorldNetDaily. Its founder, Dale Robertson, attended a Tea Party protest carrying a sign with a racial slur. Associated with the Minuteman Project. | |
| Teddy Stick | teddystick.com | | Per FactCheck.org and PolitiFact. Sourced a false claim from /r/The_Donald. | |
| TEOinfo.com | TEOinfo.com | | Per PolitiFact. Copied article from The People's Cube. | |
| The-Insider.co | The-Insider.co | | Per PolitiFact. | |
| The Big Riddle | TheBigRiddle.com | | Per PolitiFact. | |
| The Free Thought Project | thefreethoughtproject.com | | | |
| The Jim Bakker Show | jimbakkershow.com | | Spread false claims about cures for COVID-19. | |
| The Premium News | ThePremiumNews.com | | Per PolitiFact. Copied story from The Last Line of Defense. | |
| Third Estate News Group | ThirdEstateNewsGroup.com | | Per PolitiFact. Copied story from Your News Wire. | |
| Times.com.mx | Times.com.mx | | Impostor site, per PolitiFact | |
| TopInfoPost.com | TopInfoPost.con | | Per PolitiFact. | |
| topsecretleaks.com | topsecretleaks.com | | Falsely claimed that President Trump shutdown jihadi training camps in New York state. | |
| toutelinfo.fr | toutelinfo.fr | | | |
| Tribune Times Today | tribunetimestoday.com | | Impostor site setup by journalist to illustrate point about scammers monetizing impostor news sites via ad revenue. | |
| TrueAmericans.me | TrueAmericans.me | | Per PolitiFact. Republished a hoax about Barack Obama on a $1 bill, a false claim that had been circulating since 2012. | |
| True Pundit | truepundit.com | | A far-right and fake news website known for publishing conspiracy theories that often credited false stories about the FBI and Hillary Clinton to anonymous sources and claimed the mainstream media was covering it up. | |
| trumpfailedthe.us | trumpfailedthe.us | | | |
| trumpfooled.us | trumpfooled.us | | | |
| trumphasscrewed.us | trumphasscrewed.us | | | |
| trumplet.us | trumplet.us | | | |
| TheTrumpMedia.com | TheTrumpMedia.com | | Per PolitiFact. | |
| The Trumppers | thetrumppers.com | | Per FactCheck.org. Copied story from The Last Line of Defense. | |
| The Truth Is Where | thetruthiswhere.wordpress.com | | Repeats a false claim from the Conservative Beaver. | |
| UConservative | uconservative.net | | | |
| The Unhived Mind | theunhivedmind.com | | The Unhived Mind is a far-right fake news website that has frequently been shared on the alt-tech social network Gab. | |
| univverse.org | univverse.org | | Spread false claim about NASA's Kepler telescope detecting a structure built by extraterrestrials. | |
| Urban Image Magazine | UrbanImageMagazine.com | | Per PolitiFact. Cited story from World News Daily Report. | |
| Urdoca.com | Urdoca.com | | Per PolitiFact. | |
| TheUSA-News.com | TheUSA-News.com | | Per PolitiFact. | |
| USATodayNews.me | USATodayNews.me | | Impostor site, per PolitiFact | |
| usatodaypolitics.com | usatodaypolitics.com | | Reposted false story from Christian Times Newspaper. | |
| The USA Conservative | theusaconservative.com | | Per FactCheck.org and PolitiFact. The same as Usa-conservative.com. | |
| USA Conservative | Usa-conservative.com | | Per FactCheck.org. | |
| USA Conservative Report | USAConservativeReport.com | | Per PolitiFact. | |
| USA Daily Time | USADailyTime.com | | Per PolitiFact. | |
| USADailyThings24.com | USADailyThings24.com | | Per PolitiFact. | |
| USAFirstInformation.com | USAFirstInformation.com | | Per PolitiFact. | |
| usanetwork.info | usanetwork.info | | Imitates USA Network. Copied story from The Last Line of Defense. | |
| USA News Hub | theusanewshub.com | | Impostor site that plagiarizes CNBC stories. | |
| USANewsHome.com | USANewsHome.com | | Per PolitiFact. | |
| USANewsToday.com | USANewsToday.com | | Per PolitiFact. | |
| USAPolitics24hrs.com | USAPolitics24hrs.com | | Per PolitiFact. | |
| USASnich.com | USASnich.com | | Per PolitiFact. | |
| usatosday.com | usatosday.com | | Imitation of USA Today | |
| USA Train News | Trainnews.info | | Per FactCheck.org. | |
| USASupreme.com | USASupreme.com | | Per PolitiFact. | |
| USTruthWIre.com | USTruthWIre.com | | Per PolitiFact. | |
| USAWorldBox.com | USAWorldBox.com | | Per PolitiFact. | |
| US Advisor | USHealthyAdvisor.com | | Per PolitiFact. Manipulated and misattributed celebrity quote. | |
| USHealthyLife.com | USHealthyLife.com | | Per PolitiFact. | |
| USPoliticsInfo.com | USPoliticsInfo.com | | Per PolitiFact. | |
| USSA News | Ussanews.com | | Per FactCheck.org. Published false information about COVID-19 vaccinations. Fabricated a letter from the British Ministry of Defense. Promotes QAnon and Holocaust denial conspiracy theories. Shared by Paul Gosar in his newsletter in 2023. | |
| Vessel News | vesselnews.io | | | |
| Veterans For Donald Trump | VeteransForDonaldTrump.com | | Per PolitiFact. Published a false claim with a Photoshopped image as evidence. Its Facebook page was hijacked by a businessman based in North Macedonia in 2019. The original owner had worked with Liberty Writers News and USApoliticstoday.com, one of the original sites in the network of Macedonian fake news sites. One of the co-founders was arrested for carrying weapons during a vote tally during the 2020 US presidential election, and had met with the Proud Boys prior to the January 6th attacks. | |
| Viral Magazine | ViralMagazine.it | | Spread false claims about cures for COVID-19. | |
| Viral News PBS | Viralnewspbs.site | | Per FactCheck.org. | |
| VoxTribune.com | VoxTribune.com | | Per PolitiFact. | |
| Washington Feed | WashingtonFeed.com | | Impostor site, per PolitiFact. Copied story from The Last Line of Defense. | |
| The Washington Press | TheWashingtonPress.com | | Impostor site, per PolitiFact. Cites an article by Freedom Daily. | |
| The Washington Time | thewashingtontime.com | | Impostor site that plagiarizes CNBC stories. | |
| washinqtonpost.com | washinqtonpost.com | | Imitates Washington Post | |
| Wazanews.tk | Wazanews.tk | | Per FactCheck.org and PolitiFact. Copied story from The Last Line of Defense. | |
| WeekendPoliticalNews.com | WeekendPoliticalNews.com | | Per PolitiFact. Copied story from The Last Line of Defense. | |
| Werk35.com | Werk35.com | | Impostor site, per PolitiFact | |
| WestfieldPost.com | WestfieldPost.com | | Impostor site, per PolitiFact | |
| wftj8news.com | wftj8news.com | | | |
| WhatDoesItMean.com | WhatDoesItMean.com | | Per PolitiFact. According to Snopes, the site "actively advanced many invented Clinton conspiracy theories in mid-2016." Cited several times by Fars News Agency. | |
| WhatRegistrater.com | WhatRegistrater.com | | Scam website that imitates Fox News. | |
| whatsupic.com | whatsupic.com | | | |
| whereareyou90.club | whereareyou90.club | | Published hoax on missing child. Flagged by Google as potential phishing site. | |
| WhyDontYouTryThis.com | WhyDontYouTryThis.com | | Per PolitiFact. | |
| Wit The Shit | wittheshit.com | | Copied article from Empire News. Accused of using article spinning. | |
| wm21news.com | wm21news.com | | | |
| wmacnews.com | wmacnews.com | | | |
| wmb36.com | wmb36.com | | | |
| Woman Daily Tips | womandailytips.com | | Claimed that the FDA banned triclosan in toothpastes. | |
| worldinformation24.info | worldinformation24.info | | | |
| WorldNewsCircle.com | WorldNewsCircle.com | | Per PolitiFact. | |
| The World News Press | Worldnews-24.press | | Per FactCheck.org. | |
| World Politics Now | Worldpoliticsnow.com | | Per FactCheck.org and PolitiFact. Copied story from The Last Line of Defense. | |
| World.Politics.com | World.Politics.com | | Per PolitiFact. | |
| WorldTruth.tv | WorldTruth.tv | | Per PolitiFact. Spread misinformation about COVID-19 vaccines. | |
| TheWorldUpdate.com | TheWorldUpdate.com | | Per PolitiFact. | |
| wrejnews.com | wrejnews.com | | | |
| WRPM33.com | WRPM33.com | | Impostor site, per PolitiFact | |
| WY21news.com | WY21news.com | | Impostor site, per PolitiFact | |
| XBN-News | Xbn-news.com | | Per FactCheck.org. | |
| xpouzar.com | xpouzar.com | | Per Africa Check | |
| Yes I'm Right | yesimright.com | | | |
| Zero Hedge | zerohedge.com | | Noted by Graphika and NewsGuard to spread COVID-19 misinformation. Accused by the Center for Countering Digital Hate of promoting racism. Spread disinformation campaign that falsely identified driver of car that killed and injured protestors at the Unite the Right rally. Accused by the Global Disinformation Index of spreading anti-Ukrainian disinformation, anti-democratic disinformation, misogynistic disinformation, and anti-vaccine disinformation. Spread Springfield pet-eating hoax. Noted by Snopes and PolitiFact to spread unproven or false claims. | |
| ZootFeed | zootfeed.com | | | |

== Miscellaneous by country ==
=== Albania ===
| Name | Domain | Status | Notes | Sources |
|---|---|---|---|---|
| bients.com | bients.com | | Often spreading fake stories, often of political nature. | |
| The Predicted | ThePredicted.com | | Supported Bernie Sanders during the 2016 U.S. Democratic Primaries and 2016 US Presidential Election with false stories about Hillary Clinton. | |

=== Cambodia ===
The following is a list of websites linked to a group based in Cambodia that posted death hoaxes about public figures in order to spread malware.

| Name | Domain | Status | Notes | Sources |
|---|---|---|---|---|
| bx24news.com | bx24news.com | | | |
| thedailynews24hr.com | thedailynews24hr.com | | | |
| Daily90news.com | Daily90news.com | | | |
| e365media.com | e365media.com | | | |
| fnews2.com | fnews2.com | | | |
| freshnews49.com | freshnews49.com | | | |
| Freshnews85.com | Freshnews85.com | | | |
| mz24news.com | mz24news.com | | | |
| news28link.com | news28link.com | | | |
| news37zone.com | news37zone.com | | | |
| Newsa24daily.com | Newsa24daily.com | | | |
| newsidaily.com | newsidaily.com | | | |
| newskdaily.com | newskdaily.com | | | |
| ranksnews.com | ranksnews.com | | | |
| todaynewsbd.com | todaynewsbd.com | | | |
| wreddismorce.com | wreddismorce.com | | | |

=== Ghana ===
The following websites are part of a network of fake news websites registered in Ghana between 2016 and 2018, many of which have spread death hoaxes about public figures.

| Name | Domain | Status | Notes | Sources |
|---|---|---|---|---|
| 1ivescores.com | 1ivescores.com | | | |
| 1ndependent.co.uk | 1ndependent.co.uk | | | |
| ab.cnewsgo.com | ab.cnewsgo.com | | | |
| abcnewgo.com | abcnewgo.com | | | |
| aljazeera-TV.com | aljazeera-TV.com | | | |
| aljazeeranews-TV.com | aljazeeranews-TV.com | | | |
| allafricanews.co.za | allafricanews.co.za | | | |
| asianews-TV.com | asianews-TV.com | | | |
| bbctimes.com | bbctimes.com | | | |
| boroughtimes.com | boroughtimes.com | | | |
| breaking-bbc.co.uk | breaking-bbc.co.uk | | | |
| Breaking-CNN.com | Breaking-CNN.com | | Responsible for publishing numerous death hoaxes, including one for former First Lady Barbara Bush one day after her announcement that she would halt all further medical treatment in 2018. Designed to emulate CNN. | |
| cbn-TV.com | cbn-TV.com | | | |
| channels-3.com | channels-3.com | | | |
| City-Herald.com | City-Herald.com | | Per PolitiFact. | |
| cnewsgo.com | cnewsgo.com | | | |
| cnn-channel.com | cnn-channel.com | | | |
| da1lymail.com | da1lymail.com | | | |
| dailynews.tv | dailynews.tv | | | |
| dream1k.com | dream1k.com | | | |
| dw-tv3.com | dw-tv3.com | | | |
| elpais-TV.com | elpais-TV.com | | | |
| express-co.uk | express-co.uk | | | |
| Florida-times.com | Florida-times.com | | | |
| football-usa.com | football-usa.com | | | |
| Fox-news24.com | Fox-news24.com | Defunct | Imitates Fox News. Site currently down. | |
| foxnewsr.com | foxnewsr.com | | | |
| france24-TV.com | france24-TV.com | | | |
| global-news-views.news | global-news-views.news | | | |
| glonews360.com | glonews360.com | | | |
| Houston Chronicle TV | houstonchronicle-TV.com | | Not affiliated with the legitimate Houston Chronicle. | |
| huffingtonpost-fm.com | huffingtonpost-fm.com | | | |
| jetsanza.com | jetsanza.com | | | |
| livetv-news.com | livetv-news.com | | | |
| local-reports.com | local-reports.com | | | |
| m1rror.com | m1rror.com | | | |
| mailonline-TV.com | mailonline-TV.com | | | |
| maltatodays.com | maltatodays.com | | | |
| manhattan-post.com | manhattan-post.com | | | |
| News 360 | meganews360.com | | | |
| metro-uk.com | metro-uk.com | | | |
| miami-express.com | miami-express.com | | | |
| Michigan-herald.com | Michigan-herald.com | | | |
| mtv-tv3.com | mtv-tv3.com | | | |
| naij.cbn-tv.com | naij.cbn-tv.com | | | |
| news-TV.co.uk | news-TV.co.uk | | | |
| news.cbn-tv.com | news.cbn-tv.com | | | |
| news24-channel.com | news24-channel.com | | | |
| news24-TV.com | news24-TV.com | | | |
| news360-TV.com | news360-TV.com | | | |
| news7pm.com | news7pm.com | | Plagiarized its footer from The Last Line of Defense. | |
| newsdaily-TV.com | newsdaily-TV.com | | | |
| NewsPhD.com | NewsPhD.com | | Per PolitiFact. | |
| nydailynews-TV.com | nydailynews-TV.com | | Impostor site, per PolitiFact | |
| nytimes-news.com | nytimes-news.com | | | |
| ondamic.com | ondamic.com | | | |
| online.read-news.com | online.read-news.com | | | |
| online.states-tv.com | online.states-tv.com | | | |
| parliaments.eu | parliaments.eu | | | |
| primenews-TV.com | primenews-TV.com | | | |
| radiogtv.com | radiogtv.com | | | |
| read-news.com | read-news.com | | | |
| smithrise.com | smithrise.com | | | |
| states-news.com | states-news.com | | | |
| stluciantimes.com | stluciantimes.com | | | |
| streethitz.com | streethitz.com | | | |
| te1egraph.co.uk | te1egraph.co.uk | | | |
| te1egraph.com | te1egraph.com | | | |
| telegraph-TV.com | telegraph-TV.com | | | |
| Texas-express.com | Texas-express.com | | | |
| theguard1an.com | theguard1an.com | | | |
| theguidian.com | theguidian.com | | | |
| times1live.co.za | times1live.co.za | | | |
| TV-bbc.com | TV-bbc.com | | | |
| TV-cnn.com | TV-cnn.com | | | |
| updater24.com | updater24.com | | | |
| USA-Radio.com | USA-Radio.com | | Per PolitiFact. | |
| USA360-TV.com | USA360-TV.com | | Per PolitiFact. | |
| USA Television | Usa-television.com | | Impostor site, per FactCheck.org and PolitiFact. Affiliated with Fox-news24.com. | |
| usanews-TV.com | usanews-TV.com | | | |
| usatoday-TV.com | usatoday-TV.com | | | |
| za.i-telecast.com | za.i-telecast.com | | | |

=== Myanmar ===
The following is a list of websites tied to spam networks that were based in Myanmar and taken down by Facebook in 2020 for coordinated inauthentic behavior.

| Name | Domain | Status | Notes | Sources |
|---|---|---|---|---|
| itechmedia.info | itechmedia.info | | | |
| popinvdo.xyz | popinvdo.xyz | | | |
| bamakhit.com | bamakhit.com | | | |
| RAZZWIRE | razzwire.net | | Accused by the Myanmar Press Council of plagiarism from news outlets. | |
| thuta.org | thuta.org | | | |
| Shwe Wiki | shwewiki.com | | | |
| latestmyanmarnews.com | latestmyanmarnews.com | | | |
| Layaung.com | Layaung.com | | | |
| alanzayar.com | alanzayar.com | | | |
| celehits.com | celehits.com | | | |
| bahuthutagabar.net | bahuthutagabar.net | | | |
| thunkhuma.info | thunkhuma.info | | | |
| shweman.website | shweman.website | | | |
| themoonmm.club | themoonmm.club | | | |
| Let Pan - Daily News | letpandailynews.com | | | |
| myanmarfightcovid19.com | myanmarfightcovid19.com | | | |
| celemedia.club | celemedia.club | | | |
| News-uptodate.club | News-uptodate.club | | | |
| thutazone.org | thutazone.org | | | |
| khukhit.com | khukhit.com | | | |
| shwethoon8.club | shwethoon8.club | | | |
| shweman.com | shweman.com | | | |
| updatenew.net | updatenew.net | | | |
| poppingboxmm.com | poppingboxmm.com | | | |
| myanmartodaylife.com | myanmartodaylife.com | | | |
| celelove.com | celelove.com | | | |
| urdufood.xyz | urdufood.xyz | | | |
| minsatekyite.com | minsatekyite.com | | | |
| feelingnews.com | feelingnews.com | | | |
| aphawmon.com | aphawmon.com | | | |
| khitstyle.com | khitstyle.com | | | |
| storefeeling.com | storefeeling.com | | | |
| dnaethadin.com | dnaethadin.com | | | |
| hiinnommaww.site | hiinnommaww.site | | | |
| khitlunge.com | khitlunge.com | | | |
| aungthapyay.xyz | aungthapyay.xyz | | | |
| aungthapyay.com | aungthapyay.com | | | |
| sweetmyanmar.com | sweetmyanmar.com | | | |
| abcmm.net | abcmm.net | | | |
| Kalaykalar | kalaykalar.com | | | |
| bahuthutagabar.com | bahuthutagabar.com | | | |
| ONLINE LAWKA | onlinelawka.com | | Accused by the Myanmar Press Council of plagiarism from news outlets. | |
| lugyinews.com | lugyinews.com | | | |
| Online Hartha | onlinehartha.com | | | |
| khitalinmedia.com | khitalinmedia.com | | | |
| achawlaymyar.com | achawlaymyar.com | | | |
| news.mintehrlay.xyz | news.mintehrlay.xyz | | | |
| Padaethar | padaethar.com | | | |
| harthalover.com | harthalover.com | | | |
| myanmaralinn.best | myanmaralinn.best | | | |
| maynewshub.com | maynewshub.com | | | |
| sportmyanmarnews.com | sportmyanmarnews.com | | | |
| celemama.com | celemama.com | | | |
| MM Live News | mmlivenews.com | | Accused by the Myanmar Press Council of plagiarism from news outlets. | |
| alinnmyay.com | alinnmyay.com | | | |
| apannpyay.com | apannpyay.com | | | |
| apannpyaymedia.com | apannpyaymedia.com | | | |
| wowmyanmar.com | wowmyanmar.com | | | |
| luckymyanmar.com | luckymyanmar.com | | | |
| kyautthinpone.com | kyautthinpone.com | | | |
| celetrend.com | celetrend.com | | | |
| aungparsay.co | aungparsay.co | | | |
| poppingmyanmar.com | poppingmyanmar.com | | | |
| cele.mm1news.com | cele.mm1news.com | | | |
| celevillage.com | celevillage.com | | | |
| Alinnpya | alinnpya.com | | | |
| mmcelebrity.info | mmcelebrity.info | | | |
| Lupyo News | luponews.com | | | |
| hlataw.com | hlataw.com | | | |
| dnaekhitmedia.com | dnaekhitmedia.com | | | |
| burmese.asia | burmese.asia | | | |
| smilekodaw.com | smilekodaw.com | | | |
| jeeptoolay.com | jeeptoolay.com | | | |
| mmrednews.com | mmrednews.com | | | |
| newspost.xyz | newspost.xyz | | | |
| Myitter | myitter.net | | Accused by the Myanmar Press Council of plagiarism from news outlets and spreading COVID-19 misinformation. | |
| စွယ်စုံသတင်းထူးများ | topmmnews.com | | Accused by the Myanmar Press Council of plagiarism from news outlets. | |
| စွယ်စုံသတင်းထူးများ | mmtimesspecialnews.com | | Accused by the Myanmar Press Council of plagiarism from news outlets. | |
| ETS - Every Time Story | everytimestory.com | | Accused by the Myanmar Press Council of plagiarism from news outlets. | |
| santhitsa.net | santhitsa.net | | | |
| maharmedianews.com | maharmedianews.com | | | |
| cmads.site | cmads.site | | | |
| chartakemalay.website | chartakemalay.website | | | |
| mdynews.xyz | mdynews.xyz | | | |
| shwemyanmarmalay.com | shwemyanmarmalay.com | | | |
| pyawsayar.com | pyawsayar.com | | | |
| lucky7media.com | lucky7media.com | | | |
| lupyonews.com | lupyonews.com | | | |
| mzbfamily.com | mzbfamily.com | | | |
| shwepyiaye.com | shwepyiaye.com | | | |
| centralonlinenews.com | centralonlinenews.com | | | |
| xbnewsmedia.com | xbnewsmedia.com | | | |
| celemyinkwin.com | celemyinkwin.com | | | |
| bagosar.com | bagosar.com | | | |
| myanmartechnews.com | myanmartechnews.com | | | |
| tameelay.com | tameelay.com | | | |
| Myanmar Daily News | chitsakar.com | | Accused by the Myanmar Press Council of plagiarism from news outlets. | |

=== North Macedonia ===
The following websites are part of a network of fake news sites registered in North Macedonia for profit motives between the 2016 and 2020 US Presidential Election campaigns.

A 2018 report by Buzzfeed News linked the owners of an American fake news website, Liberty Writers News, to a Macedonian media attorney who operated numerous "fake news" websites during the six month lead-up to the 2016 Presidential Election. As of 2018, the governments of the United States and "at least two Western European countries" were investigating a possible connection between the Macedonian fake news sites and the Internet Research Agency, as an IRA employee was known to visit North Macedonia in 2015.

| Name | Domain | Status | Notes | Sources | |
|---|---|---|---|---|---|
| 24wpn.com | 24wpn.com | | Per PolitiFact. | | |
| 247NewsMedia.com | 247NewsMedia.com | | Per PolitiFact. | | |
| abcnews.live | abcnews.live | | Spoof of ABC News. | | |
| About2Day.com | About2Day.com | | Same owner as DailyHeadlinesNow.com. | | |
| akniinfo.com | akniinfo.com | | | | |
| AmericanPeopleNetwork.com | AmericanPeopleNetwork.com | | Per PolitiFact. | | |
| AMPosts.com | AMPosts.com | | Per PolitiFact. | | |
| armyusanews.com | armyusanews.com | | | | |
| aweirdworld.net | aweirdworld.net | | | | |
| beaware.one | beaware.one | | Published by a Macedonian officer at the Ministry of Defense. | | |
| bestconservativenews.com | bestconservativenews.com | | | | |
| BlueVision.news | BlueVision.news | | Per PolitiFact. Copied story from the Last Line of Defense. | | |
| boss24.net | boss24.net | | | | |
| bossfeed.net | bossfeed.net | | | | |
| breaktimedaily.com | breaktimedaily.com | | | | |
| butam.net | butam.net | | | | |
| BuzzFeedUSA.com | BuzzFeedUSA.com | | Per PolitiFact. Not to be confused with BuzzFeed. | | |
| BVA News | BVAnews.com | | Pro-Trump website reportedly developed by a Macedonian teenager in 2016. | | |
| cbinfo24.com | cbinfo24.com | | | | |
| ciceinfo.com | ciceinfo.com | | | | |
| cole24info.com | cole24info.com | | | | |
| conscountry.us | conscountry.us | | | | |
| Conservative Army | Conservativearmy88.com | | Per FactCheck.org and PolitiFact. | | |
| conservativecolumns.com | conservativecolumns.com | | | | |
| Conservative Fighters | conservativefighters.com | | | | |
| conservativefighters.org | conservativefighters.org | | | | |
| Conservative Flash News | ConservativeFlashNews.com | | Per PolitiFact. Copied story from the Last Line of Defense. | | |
| conservativeforever.com | conservativeforever.com | | | | |
| Conservative Info Corner | ConservativeInfoCorner.com | | Per PolitiFact. Shares the same website metadata as redcountry.us. | | |
| conservativemedia.com | conservativemedia.com | | | | |
| conservativenation.us | conservativenation.us | | | | |
| ConservativePaper.com | ConservativePaper.com | | Per PolitiFact. | | |
| ConservativePoliticus.com | ConservativePoliticus.com | | Per PolitiFact. Same owner as DailyHeadlinesNow.com. | | |
| conservativestate.com | conservativestate.com | | | | |
| theconsinfo.com | theconsinfo.com | | | | |
| ConsPatriot.com | ConsPatriot.com | | Same owner as DailyHeadlinesNow.com. | | |
| coolinfo24.com | coolinfo24.com | | | | |
| crazyifonews.com | crazyifonews.com | | | | |
| cukam.com | cukam.com | | | | |
| cukaminfo.com | cukaminfo.com | | | | |
| cukammedia.com | cukammedia.com | | | | |
| cvikas.com | cvikas.com | | | | |
| cvikasdrv.com | cvikasdrv.com | | | | |
| cvikasinfo.com | cvikasinfo.com | | | | |
| cvrcinfo.com | cvrcinfo.com | | | | |
| Daily Info Box | DailyInfoBox.com | | Per PolitiFact. Shares the same website metadata as redcountry.us. | | |
| DailyHeadlinesNow.com | DailyHeadlinesNow.com | | | | |
| dailynewsdiscovery.com | dailynewsdiscovery.com | | | | |
| dailynewspolitic.com | dailynewspolitic.com | | | | |
| dailypolitics.info | dailypolitics.info | | | | |
| dailyrethink.com | dailyrethink.com | | Published by a Macedonian officer at the Ministry of Defense. | | |
| Daily Sid News | DailySidNews.com | | Per PolitiFact. Copied story from The Last Line of Defense. | | |
| Daily USA Update | dailyusaupdate.com | | Falsely claimed that Scott Baio died in a plane crash. | | |
| dawnlightnews.com | dawnlightnews.com | | Published by a Macedonian officer at the Ministry of Defense. | | |
| derven.net | derven.net | | | | |
| dotinfo24.com | dotinfo24.com | | | | |
| Donald Trump News | DonaldTrumpNews.co | | | | |
| donaldtrumpnews.net | donaldtrumpnews.net | | | | |
| The Examiner | Theexaminer.site | | Per FactCheck.org and PolitiFact. | | |
| extraordinaryinfo.com | extraordinaryinfo.com | | Published by a Macedonian officer at the Ministry of Defense. | | |
| fergieinfo.com | fergieinfo.com | | | | |
| forfreedomworld.com | forfreedomworld.com | | | | |
| FreshDailyReport.com | FreshDailyReport.com | | Per PolitiFact. | | |
| Global Politics Now | GlobalPoliticsNow.com | | Per PolitiFact. | | |
| GlobalRevolutionNetwork.com | GlobalRevolutionNetwork.com | | Per PolitiFact. Republished a hoax about worldwide blackout. | | |
| Guerilla News | guerilla.news | | | | |
| Guerilla News | Guerillanews.com | | Falsely claimed that President Obama cancelled Peace Officers Memorial Day. | | |
| hardcoreusanews.com | hardcoreusanews.com | | | | |
| HealthyFoodHouse.com | HealthyFoodHouse.com | | | | |
| HealthyWorldHouse.com | HealthyWorldHouse.com | | Per PolitiFact. | | |
| hotmedia24.com | hotmedia24.com | | | | |
| ilovemyamerica.net | ilovemyamerica.net | | | | |
| kevkainfo.com | kevkainfo.com | | | | |
| libertyinfo.net | libertyinfo.net | | | | |
| libertyinfonews.com | libertyinfonews.com | | | | |
| libertymagazine.net | libertymagazine.net | | | | |
| libertynews.net | libertynews.net | | | | |
| thelibertynews.us | thelibertynews.us | | | | |
| Liberty Raise | Thelibertyraise.com | | Per FactCheck.org. | | |
| libertysignal.com | libertysignal.com | | | | |
| libertytoday.net | libertytoday.net | | | | |
| liberyinfo.com | liberyinfo.com | | | | |
| liberyinfo24.com | liberyinfo24.com | | | | |
| lifeeventweb.com | lifeeventweb.com | | | | |
| lifeinfo24.net | lifeinfo24.net | | | | |
| ludinfo24.com | ludinfo24.com | | | | |
| m2voice.co.uk | m2voice.co.uk | | Published by a Macedonian officer at the Ministry of Defense. | | |
| m2voice.com | m2voice.com | | Published by a Macedonian officer at the Ministry of Defense. | | |
| MacedoniaOnline.eu | MacedoniaOnline.eu | | Per PolitiFact. | | |
| magakagnews.com | magakagnews.com | | | | |
| magazinefornews.com | magazinefornews.com | | | | |
| matyinfo.com | matyinfo.com | | | | |
| meryinfo.com | meryinfo.com | | | | |
| mm24info.com | mm24info.com | | | | |
| mminfo24.com | mminfo24.com | | | | |
| myamazingnews.com | myamazingnews.com | | | | |
| mycrezynews.com | mycrezynews.com | | | | |
| mydeeptruth.com | mydeeptruth.com | | | | |
| mydeplorables.net | mydeplorables.net | | | | |
| myinfonews.com | myinfonews.com | | | | |
| myliberty.one | myliberty.one | | | | |
| New Conservatives | | | | | |
| newpoliticstoday.com | newpoliticstoday.com | | Per PolitiFact. | | |
| newpoliticstomorrow.com | newpoliticstomorrow.com | | | | |
| News Breaks Here | newsbreakshere.com | | Falsely claimed that Hillary Clinton lost the popular vote in the 2016 US Presidential Election. Copied story from The Last Line of Defense. | | |
| News Feed Hunter | NewsFeedHunter.com | | Per FactCheck.org and PolitiFact. | | |
| newspatriot.net | newspatriot.net | | | | |
| The New York Evening | TheNewYorkEvening.com | | This fake news website has spread numerous false claims, including a fake story claiming that Malia Obama had been expelled from Harvard. | | |
| NewYorkTimesPolitics.com | NewYorkTimesPolitics.com | | | | |
| Open Magazines | OpenMagazines.com | | Per PolitiFact. | | |
| opremedia.com | opremedia.com | | | | |
| opreminfo.com | opreminfo.com | | | | |
| opremmagazine.com | opremmagazine.com | | | | |
| opremmedia.com | opremmedia.com | | | | |
| patriotnetwork.one | patriotnetwork.one | | | | |
| thepetitioner.org | thepetitioner.org | | | | |
| phoenixusnews.site | phoenixusnews.site | | | | |
| planetbros.com | planetbros.com | | | | |
| politicodailynews | politicodailynews.com | | Published false quote from Sheryl Crow. Impostor site of Politico. | | |
| politicreal.com | politicreal.com | | Published by a Macedonian officer at the Ministry of Defense. | | |
| PoliticsHall.com | PoliticsHall.com | | | | |
| prcmediainfo.com | prcmediainfo.com | | | | |
| proudpatriot.us | proudpatriot.us | | | | |
| ReadConservatives.news | ReadConservatives.news | | Per PolitiFact. | | |
| redbox.news | redbox.news | | | | |
| RedCountry.us | RedCountry.us | | Per PolitiFact. | | |
| RedInfo.us | RedInfo.us | | Per PolitiFact. Shares the same website metadata as redcountry.us. | | |
| redpeople.us | redpeople.us | | Shares the same website metadata as redcountry.us. | | |
| RedPolitics.us | RedPolitics.us | | Per PolitiFact. | | |
| Resist the Mainstream | resistthemainstream.com | | Part of a disinformation network that promoted conspiracy theories about COVID-19 and the 2020 United States presidential election. Linked to the "Defiant L's" Twitter account. Supported by leadership of Gettr. Works with Criteo for online advertising revenue. The site founder contributed $2,900 to Ron Watkins's 2022 congressional campaign. | | |
| Resist the Mainstream | resistthemainstream.org | | Part of a disinformation network that promoted conspiracy theories about COVID-19 and the 2020 United States presidential election. Linked to the "Defiant L's" Twitter account. Supported by leadership of Gettr. Works with Criteo for online advertising revenue. The site founder contributed $2,900 to Ron Watkins's 2022 congressional campaign. | | |
| sacramentopress91.site | sacramentopress91.site | | | | |
| scandallinfo.com | scandallinfo.com | - | Seemorerocks | ://substack.com | A blog documented by the Atlantic Council's Digital Forensic Research Lab for its involvement in synchronized secondary-wave propagation of hoaxes and unverified conspiracy theories. |
| smithssite.com | smithssite.com | | | | |
| streetnews.one | streetnews.one | | | | |
| Success-Street.com | Success-Street.com | | Per PolitiFact. | | |
| svijmedia.com | svijmedia.com | | | | |
| tamche1966.com | tamche1966.com | | | | |
| tapainfo.com | tapainfo.com | | | | |
| Team Candace Owens | teamcandanceowens.com | | | | |
| Team Candace Owens | teamcandanceowens.org | | | | |
| teamdancrenshaw.com | teamdancrenshaw.com | | | | |
| teoinfo.com | teoinfo.com | | | | |
| thisboss.net | thisboss.net | | | | |
| todayliberty.com | todayliberty.com | | | | |
| Top Alert News | Topalertnews.com | | Likely part of the same network as Donald Trump News. | | |
| True Trumpers | truetrumpers.com | | | | |
| The Trumpers | trumpers.live | | | | |
| Trump Vision 365 | TrumpVision365.com | | | | |
| tvrtinfo.com | tvrtinfo.com | | | | |
| universale24.com | universale24.com | | | | |
| Universale Info | universaleinfo.com | | | | |
| universalemedia.net | universalemedia.net | | | | |
| UniversePolitics.com | UniversePolitics.com | | Per PolitiFact. | | |
| USA Daily Info | usadailyinfo.com | | | | |
| USA Daily Politics | USADailyPolitics.com | | | | |
| USA Daily Post | Usadailypost.us | | Per FactCheck.org and PolitiFact. | | |
| USADoseNews.com | USADoseNews.com | | Per PolitiFact. | | |
| USANews4U.us | USANews4U.us | | Per PolitiFact. Copied April Fool's Day joke from Firstpost.com. | | |
| USA Newsflash | usanewsflash.com | | Per PolitiFact. Falsely claimed that Donald Trump made an announcement as president on or around November 14, 2016, two months prior to inauguration. | | |
| usapatriotsvoice.com | usapatriotsvoice.com | | | | |
| USAPolitics.co | USAPolitics.co | | | | |
| USA Politics Now | USAPoliticsNow.com | | Per PolitiFact. | | |
| USA Politics Today | usapoliticstoday.com | | Per FactCheck.org and PolitiFact. Copied story from The Last Line of Defense. | | |
| USAPoliticsZone.com | USAPoliticsZone.com | | Per PolitiFact. | | |
| US Conservative Today | USConservativeToday.com | | | | |
| USInfoNews.com | USInfoNews.com | | Per PolitiFact. | | |
| USPoliticsLeader.com | USPoliticsLeader.com | | | | |
| US Postman | USPostman.com | | | | |
| vtamedia.com | vtamedia.com | | | | |
| WashingtonEvening.com | WashingtonEvening.com | | Impostor site, per PolitiFact | | |
| weagreeinfo.com | weagreeinfo.com | | | | |
| WeConservative.com | WeConservative.com | | Per PolitiFact. | | |
| weirdworldinfo.com | weirdworldinfo.com | | | | |
| worldnewsfrompolitics.com | worldnewsfrompolitics.com | | | | |
| World Politicus | world-politicus.com | | | | |
| World Politicus | WorldPoliticus.com | | | | |
| yougoinfo.com | yougoinfo.com | | | | |

=== Republic of Georgia ===
The following websites are part of a network of fake news sites registered in the Republic of Georgia for profit motives during the 2016 US Presidential Election campaign. Some of these sites have attempted to spread malware or obtain personal information.

| Name | Domain | Status | Notes | Sources |
|---|---|---|---|---|
| AllCrashNews.com | AllCrashNews.com | | | |
| AmericanPresident.co | AmericanPresident.co | | Per PolitiFact. Same owner as TrueTrumpers.com. | |
| American President Donald J. Trump | americanpresidentdonaldj-trump.com | | Per Associated Press and Lead Stories. Shares the same IP address or ad network ID as departed.co. | |
| AmericansMAGA.info | AmericansMAGA.info | | Part of a network of sites based in the Republic of Georgia. Plagiarized a story from The Last Line of Defense. Reportedly attempts to install malware. | |
| BBC-Breaking-News.gq | BBC-Breaking-News.gq | | | |
| BBC-Last-News.cf | BBC-Last-News.cf | | | |
| BrutalEng.com | BrutalEng.com | | | |
| CBCNews.gq | CBCNews.gq | | | |
| CNNInternationalNews.com | CNNInternationalNews.com | | Published a hoax article about a terrorist attack in New Zealand. Reportedly contains a pop-up that asks for personal information. | |
| CNNInternational.tk | CNNInternational.tk | | | |
| county911.info | county911.info | | Same owner as CountyNewsroom.info. Possibly spreads malware. | |
| CountyNewsroom.info | CountyNewsroom.info | | The fake news website, registered to Tbilisi, Georgia, makes "a minimal attempt to look official" and is used to spread malware on readers' computers. | |
| DailyMirror.cf | DailyMirror.cf | | | |
| DailyNewsPosts.info | DailyNewsPosts.info | | Per PolitiFact. Same owner as TrueTrumpers.com. | |
| dailynewspostss.com | dailynewspostss.com | | Shares the same IP address or ad network ID as departed.co. | |
| DC Posts | dcposts.info | | Same owner as TrueTrumpers.com. | |
| departed.co | departed.co | | Part of network of fake news sites registered in Georgia for profit motives during the 2016 US Presidential Elections. | |
| DepartedMe.com | DepartedMe.com | | Per PolitiFact. Shares the same IP address or ad network ID as departed.co. | |
| FacebookNeww.info | FacebookNeww.info | | | |
| FoxNewsSports.info | FoxNewsSports.info | | Same owner as TrueTrumpers.com. | |
| freedomwriters.pro | freedomwriters.pro | | Shares the same IP address or ad network ID as departed.co. | |
| HeraldNews.tk | HeraldNews.tk | | | |
| TheLocal.ga | TheLocal.ga | | Published a hoax article about a terrorist attack in Ottawa, Canada in 2016. Reportedly contains a pop-up that attempts to spread malware. | |
| maganews.co | maganews.co | | Same owner as TrueTrumpers.com. | |
| NewsLeak.co | NewsLeak.co | | Per PolitiFact. | |
| newsrooms.info | newsrooms.info | | Same owner as CountyNewsroom.info. Possibly spreads malware. | |
| NewTabi.com | NewTabi.com | | | |
| ReportForLife.com | ReportForLife.com | | | |
| statewatcher.com | statewatcher.com | | Shares the same IP address or ad network ID as departed.co. | |
| TrueTrumpers.com | TrueTrumpers.com | | This fake news website makes "claims about President Donald Trump, former President Barack Obama and Muslims, in particular, as well as click-baiting claims about porn stars and secret tricks for weight loss and whiter teeth." Same owner as departed.co. | |
| trumpence2024.com | trumpence2024.com | | Shares the same IP address or ad network ID as departed.co. | |
| UnblockedGames.eu | UnblockedGames.eu | | | |
| US4Trump | unitedstatesforpresidentrump.com | | Shares the same IP address or ad network ID as departed.co. | |
| usadailynewsposts.com | usadailynewsposts.com | | Shares the same IP address or ad network ID as departed.co. | |
| usatodaycom.com | usatodaycom.com | | Part of network of fake news sites registered in Georgia for profit motives during the 2016 US Presidential Elections. | |
| usdailynewss.com | usdailynewss.com | | Shares the same IP address or ad network ID as departed.co. | |
| usdeplorablesfortrump.com | usdeplorablesfortrump.com | | Shares the same IP address or ad network ID as departed.co. | |
| usdeplorableslovestrump.com | usdeplorableslovestrump.com | | Shares the same IP address or ad network ID as departed.co. | |
| usdeplorablesnews.com | usdeplorablesnews.com | | Shares the same IP address or ad network ID as departed.co. | |
| usfoxnews.com | usfoxnews.com | | Spoof of Fox News. Shares the same IP address or ad network ID as departed.co. | |
| usofficialnews.com | usofficialnews.com | | Shares the same IP address or ad network ID as departed.co. | |
| us-presidenttrump.com | us-presidenttrump.com | | Shares the same IP address or ad network ID as departed.co. | |
| walkwithher.com | walkwithher.com | | Part of network of fake news sites registered in Georgia for profit motives during the 2016 US Presidential Elections. | |
| World-BBC-News.com | World-BBC-News.com | | | |
| xcounty.info | xcounty.info | | Same owner as CountyNewsroom.info. Possibly spreads malware. | |

=== Republic of Kosovo ===
| Name | Domain | Status | Notes | Sources |
|---|---|---|---|---|
| ILoveNativeAmericans.us | ILoveNativeAmericans.us | | Per PolitiFact. Copied story from The Postillon, a parody/satire site. | |
| NativeAmericans.news | NativeAmericans.news | | Copied story from The Postillon, a parody/satire site. | |
| NativeStuff.us | NativeStuff.us | | Per PolitiFact. | |
| Patriotswalk | Patriotswalk.us | | Per FactCheck.org. | |
| Police Task | Policetask.com | | Per FactCheck.org. | |
| US Political News (USPOLN) | uspoln.com | | Per FactCheck.org and PolitiFact. Copied article from satire/parody site Politicops.com and fabricated quotes. | |
| Virality Things | Viralitythings.us | | Per FactCheck.org. | |
| WebViners.com | Webviners.com | | Per FactCheck.org. | |
| WeLoveNative.com | WeLoveNative.com | | Per PolitiFact. Copied story from The Postillon, a parody/satire site. | |

=== Romania ===
| Name | Domain | Status | Notes | Sources |
|---|---|---|---|---|
| Ending the Fed | endingthefed.com | | Published many false claims, including that Donald Trump was endorsed by Pope Francis in 2016. Accused by the Foreign Policy Research Institute of being part of a propaganda campaign by Russia. | |
| Expunere | expunere.com | | Same owner as Ending the Fed, targeting Romanian audiences. Accused by the Foreign Policy Research Institute of being part of a propaganda campaign by Russia. | |
