= Voice of the people (disambiguation) =

"Voice of the people" (Latin: Vox populi) generally means the opinion of the majority of the people.

Voice of the people, People's Voice or variants of the two may also refer to:

== Political parties ==
- Voice of the People (Algeria)
- Voice of the Nation (Armenia)
- Voice of the People Party (Meghalaya), a political party in Meghalaya, India
- Voice of the People Party (Namibia)
- Voice of the People of Tunisia
- People's Voice (Bulgaria)
- Voice of the Nation, or People's Voice, in Iran
- Peoples Voice (Singapore)
- People's Voice (Scottish pro-independence group)
- People's Voice Party, in Turkey
- People's Voice Party (Trinidad and Tobago)
- Blaenau Gwent People's Voice, in Wales
- Sauti ya Umma, in Tanzania

== Media ==
- Voice of the People (South Korea), a South Korean newspaper
- The Voice of the People, an anthology of folk songs
- People's Voice (newspaper), a Canadian newspaper
- Radio Voice of the People, a radio station in Zimbabwe
- The People's Voice (internet TV station)
- The People's Voice (newspaper), a newspaper published in New York City that was focused on racial issues
- The People's Voice (website), a fake news website based in Los Angeles
- "Voice of the People" (FBI: International), a 2021 television episode
- Zëri i Popullit, a newspaper in Albania
- Minsheng (Voice of the People), formerly Huiminglu, a Chinese anarchist magazine founded in the 1910s
- Voice, formerly People's Voice, a newspaper of the Australian Labor Party (Tasmanian Branch)

== Other uses ==
- Voice of the People (Israel), a Jewish conference organised by the President of Israel
- The People's Voice, an Israeli–Palestinian peace initiative

== See also ==
- Vox populi (disambiguation)
- Vox humana (disambiguation)
- People's Advocate (disambiguation)
