= People's Advocate =

People's Advocate may refer to:

== Newspapers ==
- People's Advocate (British Columbia), a former newspaper
- The People's Advocate and New South Wales Vindicator, an Australian newspaper (1848–1856)
- The People's Advocate, a Nigerian newspaper published by Abdulkareem Adisa
- The Peoples' Advocate, former newspaper in Aurora, Indiana (1868–1870)
- The People's Advocate, first African-American newspaper in the State of Virginia, U.S. (1876–1891)
- The People's Advocate (Chehalis, Washington), former newspaper in Chehalis, Washington (1892–1902)
- Uralla Times, formerly Uralla Times and People's Advocate, an Australian newspaper
- The People's Advocate (New Bern), former newspaper in New Bern, North Carolina (1886–188?)

== Other uses ==
- Romanian Ombudsman (Romanian: Avocatul Poporului 'People's Advocate'), an independent institution
- Avokati i Popullit (Albanian, 'People's Advocate'), the Albanian office of the ombudsman
- Daniel Sheehan: The People's Advocate, a 2013 memoir published by Daniel Sheehan (attorney)
- People's Advocate, Inc., founded by Paul Gann (1912–1989)

== See also ==
- Voice of the people (disambiguation)
