= Marjorie Taylor Greene =

American politician (born 1974)

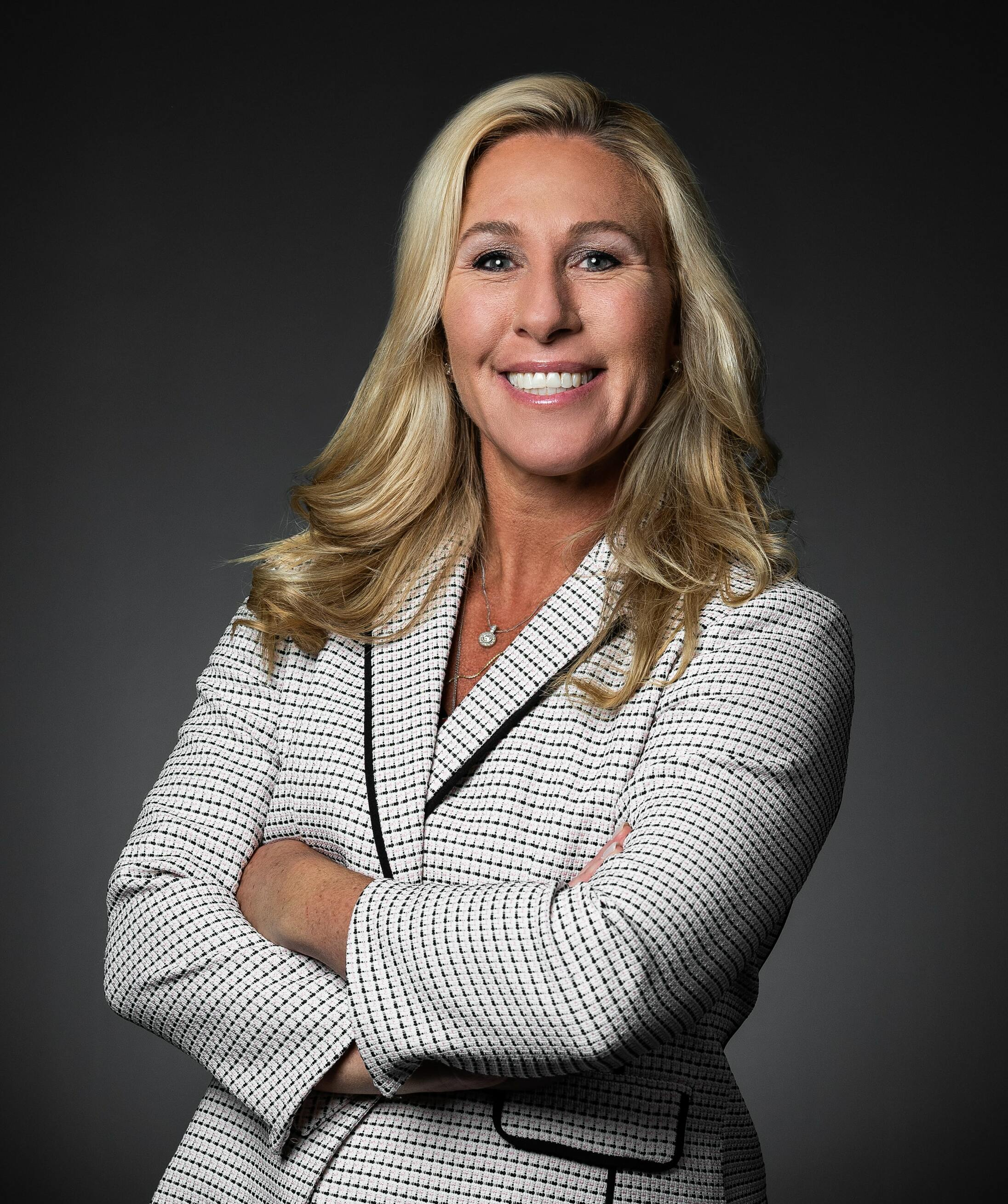
- Official portrait, 2022

Member of the U.S. House of Representatives from Georgia's 14th district
- In office January 3, 2021 – January 5, 2026
- Preceded by: Tom Graves
- Succeeded by: Clay Fuller

Personal details
- Born: Marjorie Taylor; May 27, 1974 (age 52) Milledgeville, Georgia, U.S.
- Party: Independent (2026–present)
- Other political affiliations: Republican (until 2026)
- Spouse: Perry Greene (m. 1995; div. 2022) Brian Glenn (m. 2026)
- Children: 3
- Education: University of Georgia (BBA)
- Website: House website (archived)
- Greene's voice Greene opposing the United States providing military aid to Ukraine and Israel. Recorded February 13, 2024

Marjorie Taylor Greene (Note: Taylor is her maiden name, not her middle name. She has no publicized middle name. Greene is her married name from her first husband, Perry Greene.) (née Taylor; born May 27, 1974), also known by her initials MTG, is an American politician, businesswoman, and conspiracy theorist who served as the U.S. representative for Georgia's 14th congressional district from 2021 until her resignation in 2026. A former member of the Republican Party, she was elected to Congress in 2020 following the retirement of Republican incumbent Tom Graves and was reelected in 2022 and 2024. Greene is widely considered to be a populist and far-right politician.

Greene has promoted Islamophobic, antisemitic, and white supremacist views including the white genocide conspiracy theory, as well as QAnon, and Pizzagate. She has amplified conspiracy theories that allege government involvement in mass shootings in the United States, implicate the Clinton family in murder, and suggest the attacks of 9/11 were a hoax. Before running for Congress, Greene supported calls to execute prominent Democratic Party politicians, including Hillary Clinton and Barack Obama. As a congresswoman, she equated the Democratic Party with Nazis, and compared COVID-19 safety measures to the persecution of Jews during the Holocaust, later apologizing for this comparison. During the Russian invasion of Ukraine, Greene promoted Russian propaganda and praised its president Vladimir Putin. Greene identifies as a Christian nationalist.

A vocal advocate of President Donald Trump during his first presidency, Greene aided and supported his attempts to overturn the 2020 U.S. presidential election and has promoted Trump's false claims of a stolen election. She called for the results of the 2020 U.S. presidential election in Georgia to be decertified, and was part of a group of Republican legislators who unsuccessfully challenged votes for Joe Biden during the 2021 United States Electoral College vote count, even though federal agencies and courts overseeing the election found no evidence of electoral fraud. Days after Biden's inauguration, Greene filed articles of impeachment alleging abuse of power.

The U.S. House of Representatives voted to remove Greene from all committee roles on February 4, 2021, in response to her endorsements of political violence. Eleven Republicans joined unanimous Democrats in the vote. Greene was appointed to new committee roles in January 2023. In June 2023, she was expelled from the conservative House Freedom Caucus after insulting fellow caucus member Congresswoman Lauren Boebert. In May 2024, Greene unsuccessfully attempted to oust Republican Mike Johnson from his role as Speaker of the House of Representatives.

Greene publicly criticized Trump during his second presidency, questioning whether he was "still America First" and attacking his initial opposition to the Epstein Files Transparency Act, which he later signed into law, as well as domestic and foreign policies. Trump responded by berating her on Truth Social and in the press, revoking his endorsement of her and opening the door to primarying her out of her seat. Greene subsequently announced her resignation from Congress, effective January 5, 2026, stating that she did not want her district to endure a "hurtful and hateful primary". In April 2026, amid the 2026 Iran war, Greene called for Trump to be removed from office through the Twenty-fifth amendment; as well as for the Republican Party "to be burned to the ground."

== Early life and education ==
Marjorie Taylor was born on May 27, 1974, to Robert David Taylor and Carrie Fidelle Taylor (née Bacon) in Milledgeville, Georgia. She graduated from South Forsyth High School in Cumming, Georgia, in 1992, and the University of Georgia with a Bachelor of Business Administration in 1996.

In statements made in 2019 and in a February 4, 2021 House floor speech, Greene explained her position on gun rights and school shootings. In those remarks, she alluded to being affected by a September 1990 incident at her high school in which an armed student held 53 students hostage for over five hours.

== Early career ==
In 2002, Greene's father sold Taylor Commercial, an Alpharetta, Georgia-based general-contracting company that he had founded, to Greene and her then-husband, Perry Greene. As of 2019, Greene and Perry were the company's vice president and president, respectively. Greene was listed as the chief financial officer of Taylor Commercial from 2007 to 2011, but a 2021 Atlanta Journal-Constitution investigation determined that she had no significant presence at the company. In 2011, Greene stepped down as the company's CFO and began CrossFit training.

By 2012, Greene worked as a part-time coach at an Alpharetta CrossFit gym. In August 2013, she opened CrossFit Passion in Alpharetta with Travis Mayer, a CrossFit athlete. Greene left the business in early 2017. In a 2015 interview, Greene said she and Mayer knew little about how to run a business when they started.

Greene has said that she became politically engaged during the 2016 Republican Party presidential primaries. In 2017, she began writing for the now defunct American Truth Seekers, a conspiracy news website, which published 59 articles by Greene. In January 2018, she started writing for Law Enforcement Today, a pro-police fake news website, which featured 27 articles Greene authored. In 2017, Greene visited Washington, D.C. to protest against a Republican gun control compromise.

Greene was a top official of the Family America Project, a conservative group founded in January 2018. She was a moderator of the organization's Facebook group. In that group, members posted death threats against Democrats; bigotry directed at the family of Barack Obama; and support for multiple conspiracy theories, including claims associated with the John Birch Society about the U.S. government being infiltrated by communists. (Note: Other claims in the Facebook group included COVID-19 misinformation; birtherism; allegations that Barack Obama is secretly Muslim; the Pizzagate conspiracy theory; accusations that George Soros is an "ex-Nazi billionaire" who funds nearly all of "the Democratic liberal agenda" and "OWNS Antifa, most members of congress, Black [Lives] Matter, and Acorn"; that Barack Obama and Hillary Clinton had set out to "destroy America" but were foiled by Donald Trump; that the "deep state" would deploy "bioweapons on the military and whole cities" if Donald Trump refused to step down as president; and that a "cabal of ruling elites" seeks to form a "New World Order".)

In February 2019, Greene visited the U.S. Capitol and congressional offices. In a livestream video Greene posted on Facebook, she is seen outside Representative Alexandria Ocasio-Cortez's office, calling through the mail slot for Ocasio-Cortez to unlock the door and "face the American citizens that you serve". She also asserted that Ocasio-Cortez should "get rid of [her] diaper". Greene also referred to Ocasio-Cortez's office as a day care center. When visiting the offices of representatives Ilhan Omar and Rashida Tlaib, Greene falsely claimed that they were not "official" representatives because they were sworn in to Congress on the Quran. In the videos, Greene said that she wanted Omar and Tlaib to instead be sworn in on the Bible and accused the two representatives of supporting Islamic law.

== U.S. House of Representatives ==
=== Elections ===
==== 2020 ====
===== Primary election =====
Having originally announced her intention to run in Georgia's 7th congressional district, Greene instead began her campaign in the 6th district, where she resided, on June 4, 2019. (Note: She had filed with the FEC on May 29.) She stated her commitment to balance the federal budget and restrain Congress from using its constitutional power to spend more money, adding: "If we look at our country as our household, we're going to go under foreclosure because we're overspending." Greene also criticized her expected primary opponent, former U.S. representative Karen Handel, for supporting large omnibus spending bills and a series of electoral losses: "She's lost seven races in her entire political career... She steps down from seats that she does win so she can campaign for something else. Basically I would call her [a] professional campaigner, but she loses."

On December 13, 2019, Greene announced that she was shifting her campaign to the 14th district after incumbent Tom Graves announced he would not run for reelection there. The district includes much of Northwest Georgia, stretching from the Georgia side of the Chattanooga metropolitan area to the exurbs of Atlanta. Members of the House are constitutionally required to live in the state they represent, but not necessarily in the same congressional district. Hence, although Greene had lived for a long time in Milton, in the 6th district, there would have been no legal barrier to Greene running for the 14th. Still, she said she intended to move to the 14th if she ran there. She subsequently bought a home in nearby Paulding County, which is in the 14th. By the time she was sworn in in January 2021, Greene reported having moved to Rome, also firmly in the 14th.

On February 29, 2020, Greene spoke at a gun rights rally in Villanow hosted by Silent No Longer, a group campaigning to make Walker County a Second Amendment sanctuary. At the rally, she held up a banner for American Patriots USA – a far-right group attempting to further its influence with Georgia Republicans. Greene posed for photos with Chester Doles, a 5th-generation Ku Klux Klansman, Grand Klaliff leader, and founder of APUSA; Doles has nearly a dozen assault arrests and served two separate prison sentences in Maryland.

Greene campaigned as a staunch supporter of President Donald Trump but was not endorsed by him. She ran on the slogan "Save America, Stop Socialism!" In the days before the primary, Facebook took down a Greene video for violating its terms of service. In the video, Greene held an AR-15 style rifle and warned antifa groups to "stay the hell out of Northwest Georgia".

Greene finished first in the June 9 primary. Trump tweeted, "A big winner". Because no candidate received a majority of the vote, she faced neurosurgeon John Cowan in a runoff election. Although Cowan was a Trump supporter, Greene labeled him a RINO, short for "Republican in name only".

Republican primary results
Party	Candidate	Votes	%
Republican	Marjorie Taylor Greene	43,892	40.3
Republican	John Cowan	22,862	21.0
Republican	John Barge	9,619	8.8
Republican	Clayton Fuller	7,433	6.8
Republican	Bill Hembree	6,988	6.4
Republican	Kevin Cooke	6,699	6.2
Republican	Matt Laughridge	6,220	5.7
Republican	Ben Bullock	3,883	3.6
Republican	Andy Gunther	1,220	1.1
Total votes		108,816	100.0

===== Runoff election =====
In a July 14 runoff debate, Cowan questioned Taylor Commercial's acceptance of Paycheck Protection Program money in relation to Greene's opposition to congressional appropriations of relief funds during the pandemic and also Taylor Commercial's donations to Greene's political campaign. Taylor Commercial received $182,300 in PPP funding from the Small Business Administration during the COVID-19 pandemic. SBA filings declared Taylor Commercial expected to save 12 jobs with the funds. Around two months after her company received the PPP loan, Greene donated $450,000 to her campaign.

Greene won the August 11 runoff. On the day after her runoff victory, Trump tweeted his support for her, calling her a future Republican star.

Republican runoff results
Party	Candidate	Votes	%
Republican	Marjorie Taylor Greene	43,813	57.1
Republican	John Cowan	32,982	42.9
Total votes		76,795	100.0

===== General election =====
Greene was considered an overwhelming favorite to win the seat in the general election, as the 14th district typically votes heavily Republican. In 2017, the Cook Political Report ranked the district the 10th-most Republican in the country.

On September 3, 2020, Greene shared a meme to her Facebook page depicting herself holding an AR-15 style rifle next to a collage of pictures of Ocasio-Cortez, Omar and Tlaib. She wrote that it was time for "strong conservative Christians to go on the offense against these socialists who want to rip our country apart"; the caption under the images was "Squad's worst nightmare". Nancy Pelosi called the meme a threat of violence, and Omar demanded that it be deleted after claiming it had triggered death threats. In response to questions from Forbes about whether the meme was a threat, a Greene campaign spokesperson dismissed that idea. Facebook deleted the meme the next day for violating its policies on inciting violence, prompting Greene to claim that Democrats were trying to "cancel" her. On September 19, 2020, Greene appeared at a gun rights rally in Ringgold, Georgia, where the Georgia III% Martyrs provided security "wearing camouflage, body armor, radios, and in one case a battle ax". During the rally, Greene had Chester Doles – with whom she had posed for a photo earlier in the year – ejected, and U.S. senator Kelly Loeffler made a brief appearance.

Greene was expected to face Democratic IT specialist Kevin Van Ausdal, but he withdrew from the race on September 11. This left Greene unopposed in the general election, which she won with 74% of the vote. Van Ausdal, whose name remained on the ballot, took 25%. During her victory speech, Greene called Pelosi "anti-American", a "hypocrite", and a "bitch" whom "we're going to kick ... out of Congress", and had a reporter from The Atlanta Journal-Constitution ousted from the venue after he tweeted quotes from her speech. She later mocked Van Ausdal's appearance and got into an argument with former Republican senator Jeff Flake on Twitter.

In the days after the election, Greene made deceptive claims that her husband Perry's Floyd County voting record revealed voter fraud, writing on social media that when her husband went to vote early, he was told he had received an absentee ballot despite not requesting one. Floyd County chief elections clerk Robert Brady told The Atlanta Journal-Constitution that nothing happened to the missing ballot, and that it was canceled according to procedure, adding that "he [Perry Greene] signed an affidavit on [October] 23rd and he was allowed to vote. ... He only voted one time."

Georgia's 14th congressional district, 2020
Party	Candidate	Votes	%
Republican	Marjorie Taylor Greene	229,827	74.7
Democratic	Kevin Van Ausdal (Note: Withdrew, remained on ballot)	77,798	25.3
Total votes		307,625	100.0
Republican hold			

===== Endorsements =====
Prominent Republicans who supported Greene in her candidacy included Donald Trump; U.S. representatives Jim Jordan, Andy Biggs, and Matt Gaetz; Turning Point USA founder Charlie Kirk; and Trump's chief of staff Mark Meadows. Meadows's wife, Debbie Meadows, is the executive director of RightWomen PAC, which endorsed Greene and contributed $17,500 to her runoff campaign. Other donors included Barb Van Andel-Gaby – the chair of the board of the Heritage Foundation – and attorney L. Lin Wood, who later promoted conspiracy theories about the 2020 U.S. presidential election. Greene also received support from the House Freedom Fund, a political action committee and the campaign fundraising arm of the House Freedom Caucus. The Georgia Republican Party contributed $5,220 to her campaign treasury on March 2, 2020.

==== 2022 ====
In September 2021, the Federal Election Commission asked Greene's 2022 re-election campaign treasurer, her then-husband, to provide information about $3.5 million of unitemized campaign contributions from undisclosed donors received in the first half of 2021. By federal law, only individual contributions under $200 are allowed to be unitemized or have donor identity withheld. Greene received more donations than any other House Republican in the first three months of 2021.

In April, Greene faced a legal challenge to her eligibility based on her alleged involvement in organizing and promoting the 2021 United States Capitol attack, based on the Fourteenth Amendment to the United States Constitution, which bars people who have engaged in insurrection from serving in Congress. In May, Greene defeated Jennifer Strahan in the Republican primary.

Greene was reelected in November 2022, defeating Democratic nominee Marcus Flowers; Greene received 65.9 percent of the vote.

==== 2024 ====
Marjorie Taylor Greene's opponent in the 2024 general election was the Democratic Party nominee, retired Army Brigadier General Shawn Harris, a cattle rancher and 40-year military veteran. Greene was reelected in November 2024, receiving 64.4 percent of the vote.

=== Tenure ===
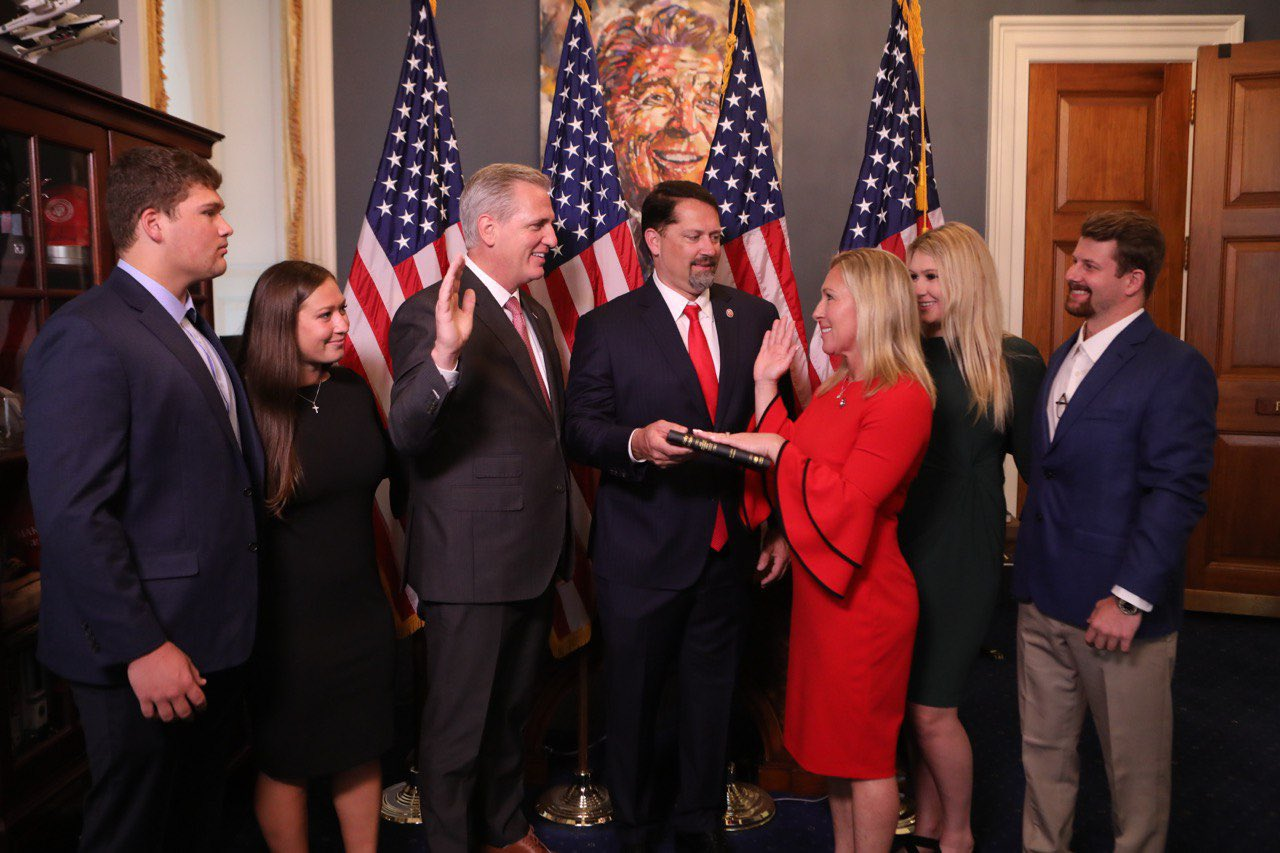
Greene being sworn in by Minority Leader Kevin McCarthy

On her first day in office, Greene wore a face mask onto the House floor that read "Trump Won", despite Trump having lost the 2020 U.S. presidential election to Joe Biden. During the counting of electoral votes, Greene raised an objection to counting Michigan's electoral votes. The objection was not signed by a member of the U.S. Senate and therefore was rejected.

In response to the January 6 U.S. Capitol attack by Trump supporters, Greene called for an end to violence and for support for Trump. She refused to wear a face mask while sheltering in place during the riot, and during the debate to impeach Trump she tweeted: "Democrats must be held accountable for the political violence inspired by their rhetoric." This prompted Democratic representative Jason Crow to call her "morally bankrupt", "depraved" and "frankly dangerous".

In a series of tweets following the attack on the Capitol, Greene falsely suggested that the rioters were members of antifa dressed as Trump supporters. Greene made these claims even though Anthony Aguero, a conservative activist and close associate of hers, was one of the people who stormed the Capitol. She also retweeted a clip from Fox News host Tucker Carlson, in which Carlson – citing Revolver News, a right-wing news website – claimed that agents of the Federal Bureau of Investigation might have organized and participated in the attack. Later that month, Greene asked Trump to issue her a pardon for her efforts to overturn the 2020 election.

Greene supported efforts to impeach Joe Biden. On January 21, 2021, the second day of Biden's presidency, Greene filed articles of impeachment against him, citing alleged abuse of power as the reason for impeachment. In an interview with Greg Kelly of Newsmax, she perpetuated the Biden–Ukraine conspiracy theory alleging that Biden had been bought off by foreign interests. By September 2022, Greene had introduced five different resolutions to impeach Biden.

On January 27, 2021, Representative Jimmy Gomez announced he had drafted a resolution to expel Greene from the House after reports that she had previously called for violence against Democrats. Representative Jake Auchincloss also called for Greene's resignation or expulsion due to her threats of violence against fellow lawmakers. On January 28, with the revelations of Greene's threats against Democratic members of the House, Pelosi spoke of an "enemy within the House of Representatives" and the need to increase security measures, stating that this referred to "members who want to bring guns on the floor and have threatened violence on other members of Congress" – alluding to Greene and other Republican representatives, such as Lauren Boebert, who wanted to bring guns onto the House floor. Pelosi also criticized the House Republican leadership for placing Greene on the Education Committee after Greene had questioned the authenticity of deadly school shootings around the country.

On January 29, 2021, representatives Nikema Williams and Sara Jacobs introduced a resolution to censure Greene for making threatening comments to her colleagues and to call for her resignation. The bill was referred to the House Ethics committee and never received a vote. On March 19, Gomez formally introduced his resolution to expel Greene, with the support of 72 Democrats and no Republicans. The bill was referred to the House Ethics committee and never received a vote.

The Washington Post reported in May 2021 that two of its reporters observed Greene aggressively confront Ocasio-Cortez outside the House chamber, loudly asking why she supported antifa and Black Lives Matter, which Greene falsely characterized as terrorists. Ocasio-Cortez did not respond and called on House leadership to ensure that Congress remains "a safe, civil place for all Members and staff".

Later in May, Greene voted against the January 6 commission, a proposed commission which would have investigated the attack on the Capitol. During a speech she made against establishing a commission, Greene called for justice for Ashli Babbitt, a Trump supporter who was fatally shot by a Capitol police officer when she stormed the Capitol and attempted to break into the House chamber.

Also in May, Greene and Gaetz initiated a nationwide "America First Tour", beginning in The Villages, Florida. Throughout the tour, the two repeated unsubstantiated claims of fraud purported to have occurred during the 2020 election. Later in July, a scheduled rally in Laguna Hills, California, was canceled after the venue withdrew.

In June 2021, Greene was one of 21 House Republicans to vote against a resolution to give the Congressional Gold Medal to police officers who defended the U.S. Capitol on January 6. When Pelosi announced the creation of the House Select Committee on the January 6 Attack, Greene declared her interest in being seated on it.

In August 2021, after the House Select Committee on the January 6 Attack requested that over 30 telecommunications companies retain phone records related to the attack, including those of Greene and several other members of Congress, she promised that companies that complied would be "shut down".

In February 2022, Greene spoke at a conference hosted by white supremacist Nick Fuentes, at which Fuentes called the January 6 attack "awesome" and praised Putin and Hitler. When criticized for her attendance, Greene denounced these criticisms as "identity politics" and an attempt to "cancel" her, and labelled critics "Pharisees".

On June 22, 2023, Greene and Congresswoman Elise Stefanik introduced a pair of resolutions to expunge both of Trump's impeachments. The next day, Republican Speaker of the House Kevin McCarthy lent his support to the resolutions. In January 2025, Greene again introduced a pair of resolutions to expunge the impeachments.

In June 2023, Greene was expelled from the Freedom Caucus by a vote of its members. The vote came after Greene called fellow caucus member Lauren Boebert a "little bitch" during an argument on the House floor. It was the first time the group ever voted to expel one of its members. While the remark about Boebert was given as the primary reason for Greene's expulsion, Greene had also gone against some caucus positions and had allied herself with Speaker McCarthy, who was opposed by many in the caucus during the speaker election.

Greene told The Atlanta Journal-Constitution in 2024 that if Trump won the presidential election, she would be "certainly particularly interested" in serving as the secretary of homeland security. In June 2024, when questioning Anthony Fauci at a congressional hearing, Greene repeatedly refused to address Fauci as Doctor, questioned his medical licence and accused him of covering up COVID-19's origins.

In June 2025, Greene criticized Trump's support for Israeli strikes against Iran and opposed the possible involvement of the United States in the war.

In November 2025, Greene began supporting the House of Representatives' discharge petition that would release the files from the Jeffrey Epstein client list and criticized Trump for actively opposing the database's release. Greene also supported greater measures to protect the affordability of health care services and basic needs. Supporting these policies meant that Greene lost the support of Trump. In addition to Greene's other policy shifts, she has also started referring to the Israeli government's actions during the Gaza war as genocide and criticized Trump's efforts to increase deportations.

On November 21, 2025, Greene announced that she would resign from her seat in the U.S. House of Representatives, with the resignation going into effect on January 5, 2026. Greene said that Trump attacked her over her support for the anti-AIPAC organization Track AIPAC and the release of the Epstein files. In mid-December, BBC News summarized the Trump–Greene feud as beginning with "her backing of a full release of the government files connected to the Jeffrey Epstein underage sex-trafficking case – long a source of conservative conspiracy theories. It broadened, however, into a critique of Trump's Middle East policy and accusations of his failure to address cost-of-living and healthcare concerns for low-income American voters."

=== Committee assignments ===
Greene was briefly a member of the Committee on the Budget and the Committee on Education and Labor. She was removed from all committee assignments on February 4, 2021, due to incendiary remarks she had made before her election. She was appointed to new committee roles in January 2023.

For the 118th Congress:

- Committee on Homeland Security
  - Subcommittee on Border Security and Enforcement
  - Subcommittee on Oversight, Investigations, and Regulations
- Committee on Oversight and Accountability
  - Subcommittee on Cybersecurity, Information Technology, and Government Innovation
  - Subcommittee on Government Operations and the Federal Workforce
- Select Subcommittee on the Coronavirus Pandemic

=== Caucus memberships ===
- Election Integrity Caucus
- Republican Study Committee
- Second Amendment Caucus

Greene had also been a member of the House Freedom Caucus, but was voted out in mid-2023 after insulting Congresswoman Lauren Boebert, another member of the caucus. Greene had allegedly called Boebert a "little bitch" and accused Boebert of copying articles of impeachment served against Biden.

== Political positions ==
Greene has promoted multiple conspiracy theories, including QAnon, that secret groups can control the weather, the claim that Hillary Clinton is responsible for a series of murders, that Democratic Party elites are responsible for a satanic child sex trafficking ring, that the government orchestrated the 2017 Las Vegas shooting, that the Stoneman Douglas High School shooting in Parkland, Florida, was a false flag attack intended to help introduce gun control, that the Sandy Hook Elementary School shooting was staged, that Barack Obama secretly visited North Korea and sabotaged nuclear diplomacy to cover up untoward dealings with Iran, that Obama and his advisor Valerie Jarrett were secretly Muslim, and that the September 11 attack on the Pentagon was fake. Greene also promoted a false anti-Semitic conspiracy theory that the 2018 Camp Fire, a deadly wildfire in California, may have been caused by "what looked like lasers or beams of blue light" from "space solar generators" in a scheme involving California Governor Jerry Brown, companies PG&E, Rothschild & Co, and Solaren.

Greene opposes abortion. Greene has expressed racist, antisemitic, and Islamophobic views. She was dismissive of the COVID-19 pandemic, the COVID-19 vaccine, and refused to wear a mask in Congress. She is anti-immigration, and pro-gun rights. She is against the Affordable Care Act and the Infrastructure Investment and Jobs Act. In foreign policy, she has been anti-China, critical of NATO, and pro-Russia and anti-Ukraine.

Greene is a supporter of President Donald Trump; on January 4, 2021, she called for the results of the 2020 U.S. presidential election in Georgia to be decertified. After Trump's second impeachment, she introduced an article of impeachment against Biden on January 21, the day after he took office; no one co-sponsored it.

She has been hostile to trans rights, denies that transgender people exist, and has been described in the media as transphobic. Greene opposes the Black Lives Matter movement and has called it a Marxist group.

In a recording obtained by Politico, Greene said that Muslims who believe in Sharia law should not be in the U.S. government. She also contended that the Democratic Party is holding Black Americans as "slaves". Greene said that the election of Ilhan Omar and Rashida Tlaib in the 2018 midterm elections was part of "an Islamic invasion of our government", and in 2021, she called the Squad supporters of "terrorism" and "Hamas" who "don't belong in Congress" and referred to them as the "Jihad Squad". Greene has defended Christian nationalism and described herself as a "proud Christian nationalist".

Greene rejects the scientific consensus that climate change is caused primarily by human activity. Greene has said that she does not accept the scientific consensus of evolution, calling it a "type of so-called science" and saying: "I don't believe in evolution. I believe in God."

The New York Times detailed Greene's support for and past ties with extremist militia groups, including the Three Percenters and the Oath Keepers; both groups had members participate in the 2021 attack on the U.S. Capitol. Greene has produced rhetoric suggesting her political opponents should be killed. Greene celebrated the death of Pope Francis.

== In popular culture ==
On January 30, 2021, the tenth episode of Saturday Night Live's 46th season featured a cold open where a caricature of Greene, played by Cecily Strong, espoused debunked conspiracy theories and discussed how she "told [her] supporters that they should physically murder Nancy Pelosi". After Greene opposed the Equality Act, her character featured again in February on the Weekend Update sketch, wherein she misspelled "science", compared herself to Pennywise the Dancing Clown, pulled a handgun on co-anchor Colin Jost, and claimed to be possessed by a demon. In June 2021, The Late Show with Stephen Colbert played a satirical, conspiracy-themed calendar song mocking Greene after she requested Biden reply to a letter she sent "by June 31", a date which does not exist.

On June 15, 2021, after Greene's visit to the Holocaust Museum, Jimmy Kimmel Live! host Jimmy Kimmel called Greene "human excrement", "Klan Mom", and "the sorriest excuse for a congresswoman we've ever had", comparing her understanding of the Holocaust to that of a sixth-grader and digitally imposing a toothbrush mustache over her apology video. Daily Show host Trevor Noah called her "your crazy aunt's even crazier friend" who has become "notorious for saying absolutely anything with zero shame". The View co-host Joy Behar called Greene's apology "as empty as her head" and jokingly remarked, "wait till she hears about slavery!"

On February 9, 2022, while discussing the police guarding the Capitol building, Greene, using a malapropism, called them "gazpacho police", confusing the cold Spanish soup with the Gestapo. The incident met with a wave of jokes about her confusion. A similar incident occurred in May 2022, with Greene calling a Petri dish a "peach tree dish" during a livestream.

In April 2022, Kimmel said of Greene, "Where is Will Smith when you really need him?" in response to Greene accusing Republicans who supported then-Supreme Court nominee Ketanji Brown Jackson of being "pro-pedophile", referencing the incident in which Smith slapped comedian Chris Rock at the Academy Awards. Greene accused Kimmel of threatening violence against her and tweeted that she contacted the Capitol Police. Greene had previously refused to honor the Capitol Police in June 2021, when she voted against rewarding them with the Congressional Gold Medal for defending the Capitol Building during the 2021 United States Capitol attack. On April 8, Nick Dyer, Greene's spokesman, said that "threats against Congresswoman Greene invoking Jimmy Kimmel have been coming into our office".

The character Firecracker from Season 4 of Amazon's The Boys was based on Greene. The show's creator Eric Kripke said in an interview, "You had Trump, but now you have these Trump spawn that are trying to outdo each other for how outrageous and sexualized and gun-toting and slavishly obedient they can be."

== Personal life ==
Greene married Perry Greene in 1995 while they were in college, and they have three children. Perry Greene filed for divorce in September 2022, stating that the marriage was "irretrievably broken"; the divorce was finalized on December 22, 2022. In 2023, Greene began dating Brian Glenn, the director of programming for Right Side Broadcasting Network. They married in Las Vegas, on July 28, 2026.

Greene was baptized, raised, and married as a member of the Roman Catholic Church, but stopped attending Catholic Mass in reaction to the child sexual abuse crisis in the church. She was rebaptized in 2011 into North Point Community Church, an evangelical megachurch network based in Alpharetta, in a baptism published in an online video. She speaks often about her faith and has said that she wants to bring "my faith and my family values to Washington".

Greene participated in the CrossFit quarterfinals for the 2014, 2015, and 2018 CrossFit Games.

ABC affiliate WSB-TV in Atlanta reported in May 2021 that Greene broke Georgia law by claiming homestead exemptions on two properties, when only one may legally be claimed. One property was an older home, and the other purchased in Georgia's 14th congressional district when she ran for office; Greene responded that the issue was "paperwork", and would be addressed.

Her memoir MTG, published in November 2023, details Greene's upbringing, her first campaign for Congress, and her three-year tenure as a United States representative.

== See also ==
- Conspiracy theories in United States politics
- Radical right (United States)

== Explanatory notes ==
U.S. House of Representatives
Preceded by Tom Graves	Member of the U.S. House of Representatives from Georgia's 14th congressional district 2021–2026	Succeeded by Clay Fuller
U.S. order of precedence (ceremonial)
Preceded by Andrew Young as Former U.S. Representative	Order of precedence of the United States as Former U.S. Representative	Succeeded by Robert H. Steele as Former U.S. Representative
