= Vox pop (disambiguation) =

Vox pop is a shortened form of the Latin phrase Vox populi.

Vox pop may also refer to:

- Vox Pop (radio), a program broadcast in the 1930s and 1940s
- Vox Pop, a 1980s punk band with future members of 45 Grave
- Vox Pop, a 1990 Brazilian vocal group directed by Jayme Amatnecks

== See also ==
- Vox populi (disambiguation)
