= Voxx =

Voxx may refer to:

- Voxx (album), a 1980 album by Bay City Rollers
- Voxx International, an American consumer electronics company
- Voxx Records, subsidiary of Bomp! Records
- Rádio Voxx, a defunct Portuguese radio station

== See also ==
- Vox (disambiguation)
