= Vox populi (disambiguation) =

Vox populi is a Latin phrase meaning 'voice of the people'.

Vox populi may also refer to:

== Film and television ==
- Vox populi (film), a 2008 Dutch film
- Vox Populi (TV series), an Australian current-affairs program 1986–1995
- "Vox Populi" (Jericho), a television episode
- "Vox Populi", an episode of The Equalizer (2021 TV series)#Season 2 (2021–22)

== Music ==
- Vox populi sound system, a group of DJs etc. based in London
- "Vox Populi", a song by 30 Seconds to Mars from This Is War
- "Vox Populi", a song by Sepultura from Nation
- "Vox Populi", a song from Hazbin Hotel
- "Vox Populi", a song by Mikael Gabriel and nublu entered in the 2024 Uuden Musiikin Kilpailu, the Finnish national final for the Eurovision Song Contest

== Other uses ==
- Vox Populi (art gallery), in Philadelphia, U.S.
- Vox Populi, a 1620 tract against the Spanish Match, by Thomas Scott
- Vox Populi, a review website by Edgeworks Entertainment
- "Vox populi", the slogan of radio station WVOX
- Vox Populi, a fictional movement in the video game BioShock Infinite

== See also ==
- Vox pop (disambiguation)
- Vox humana (disambiguation)
- Voice of the people (disambiguation)
- Vox populi, vox Dei, ('the voice of the people is the voice of the Gods')
  - Vox Populi, Vox Dei, a Whig tract of 1709
