= Prntly =

Right wing news site

Prntly.com
- Website type: Politics; Fake news
- Available in: English
- Owner: Prntly LLC
- Creator: Alexander Portelli
- Website: www.prntly.com
- Commercial: Yes
- Launched: 2015; 11 years ago
- Current status: active

Prntly: America's Top News Site (known simply as Prntly) is an American fake news website that supports Trump and right-leaning causes. The site gained attention in 2015 when then candidate Donald Trump tweeted links to the site. Prntly was listed as being based in New Hampshire but no business registration could be found in 2016.

== Creator ==
Prntly was founded in 2015 by Alexander M Portelli. Portelli dropped out of high school at age 14, and served time after being arrested at age 19 selling ecstasy. Portelli attempted a mayoral candidacy in Albany, New York, first as a libertarian, then as an independent after the local Libertarian Party disavowed him. Portelli was the only one of six candidates invited to a WAMC discussion. It wasn't clear if he could run for office in New York based on his criminal status, and he dropped out, endorsing his mother as a write-in candidate for the Green party.

Portelli owned a overnight diner, "Portelli's Joe n’ Dough Cafe", opened January 2013 and closed 16 months later. He also owned some ATMs under the trademark AMP Calypso. Portelli also created a left-leaning site, MarshallReport.com, which was less successful than Prntly. After moving to New Hampshire, Portelli created sites called Porcuprint and Portelli ATM. Portelli launched a Wefunder crowdfunding campaign for Prntpage in 2019 and discussed commercial property in Colorado, managing renters and short-term (Airbnb) properties in Las Vegas in 2020. He also stated he was importing coronavirus antibody tests and masks, stating he has 100,000 masks on hand and 250,000 on their way, selling on eBay, Facebook, and OfferUp, then to restaurants, medical suppliers, and hospitals "across the country". He said US Customs was seizing half of an order of 40,000 masks in March, so he drove to Los Angeles to get them. He said he was also manufacturing masks in Costa Rica.

Portelli lives in Cherry Valley, New York. In late April, 2026, he officially launched his campaign to run as a Republican in the November race for the 19th Congressional District.

== Website ==
Portelli created the site with web developer Josh Barton. The website saw massive growth in readership in the first year of operation, jumping from an anonymous print site with a blog to being one of the top 2000 sites in the United States, with an average monthly visitor rate of a million people during the 2016 election cycle. The Washington Post reported that then-candidate Donald Trump read the website, and tweeted links to the site. The Post also noted some of its articles were plagiarized.

Between 2017 and 2020, the site went defunct due to social media sites cracking down on fact checking.

With the 2020 election coming up and the George Floyd Protests, Prntly started up again, claiming Bikers for Trump was planning to invade the Capitol Hill Autonomous Zone. The story was picked up by Big League Politics ("pledging to retake Seattle's Capital[sic] Hill Autonomous Zone") and Gateway Pundit ("Initial Reports: Bikers for Trump and Other Groups Planning to Retake Seattle Occupation Zone on July 4th"). Mediaite factchecked with Bikers for Trump, who indicated neither outlet had contacted them. Portelli posted on Facebook that he recruited "12,000 patriots" for the event.

In 2015, Snopes regarded the site as a "a disreputable outlet that has a penchant for publishing both fake news and spurious pro-Trump articles." Snopes also documented a case of the site recycling a story from fellow fake/hoax news site Now8News and changing the details.
