= Vox populi sound system =

Vox Populi was a sound system based in South East London. It was active in holding free parties in both the United Kingdom and Europe, between 1993 and 1996. These sound system events were often held in disused industrial sites and warehousing.

== Touring Europe ==
In June 1994 Vox Populi toured Europe starting in France at the Millau Teknival. The tour then went to Paris where all of the sound equipment was confiscated during a busted Rave in Bobeney by the French riot police or CRS. Once all the equipment was released by the police the Sound System travelled on to the Teknival in the Czech Republic to meet up with other sound systems including Spiral Tribe.
