= List of fake news troll farms =

The following is a list of websites, separated by country, that have been described by journalists and researchers as spreading false information or impersonating news websites, and likely being linked to troll farms.

== List ==
=== Russia ===
Name	Domain	Status	Notes	Sources
BlackMatters.com	BlackMatters.com		Impostor site affiliated with the Internet Research Agency. Promoted a protest at Stone Mountain, Georgia in 2016 that was attended by white nationalists and anti-racist activists.	
LiveReport	livereport.co.za			
nation-news.ru	nation-news.ru			
Newsroom for American and European Based Citizens (NAEBC)	naebc.com			
OnePoliticalPlaza.com	OnePoliticalPlaza.com		Per PolitiFact. Promoted by the Internet Research Agency via Google AdWords. Claimed in a letter to the FEC to be run by a for-profit company registered in Florida. In 2020, the purported owner of the site, IDF International Technologies, Inc., was advised by the FEC that their "activities are not expenditures, contributions, or electioneering communications under the [Federal Election Campaign Act, 52 U.S.C. §§ 30101-45] and [Federal Election Commission] regulations."	
polit.info	polit.info			
rueconomics.ru	rueconomics.ru			
Russian Federal News Agency (RIAFAN)	riafan.ru			
SADC News	sadcnews.org			
