= Uralla Times =

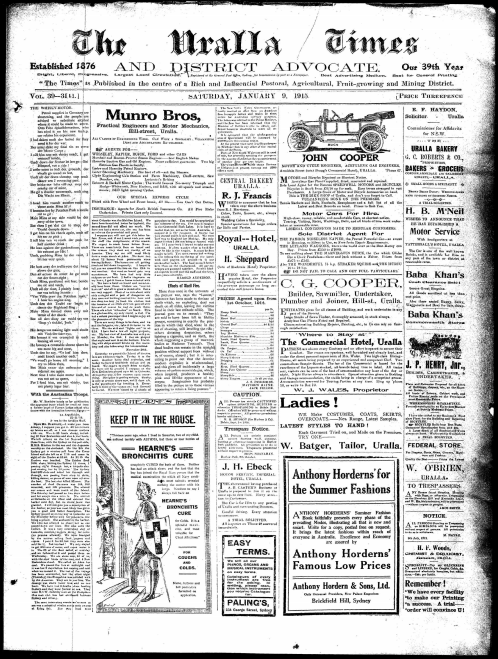
Front page of the Uralla Times on 9 January 1915

The Uralla Times was a newspaper published under various titles between 1895 and 1983 for the town of Uralla, New South Wales, Australia.

== History ==
The paper began as the Uralla Times and People's Advocate between 1895 and 1904 and was published by Henry Cleve St. Vincent and Frank Walter Vincent before it was bought by her son, Barnes Vincent, in 1918.

From 1923 until 1983 it was known as the Uralla Times and was published by the Armidale Newspaper Co. between 1946 and 1975, and by Northern Newspapers between 1980 and 1983.

== Digitisation ==
The paper has been digitised as part of the Australian Newspapers Digitisation Program of the National Library of Australia.

== See also ==
- List of newspapers in Australia
- List of newspapers in New South Wales
