= Ultravox (disambiguation) =

Ultravox were a British new wave band.

Ultravox may also refer to:

- Ultravox! (album), the debut album by Ultravox
- Ultravox (software), video streaming software from Nullsoft
