= Vox humana (disambiguation) =

Vox humana (Latin, 'human voice') is a reed stop on the pipe organ.

Vox humana may also refer to:

- 1974 cantata by Allan Pettersson
- Vox Humana (Alfred Wolfsohn album), 1956
- Vox Humana (Daniel Amos album), 1984
- Vox Humana (Kenny Loggins album), 1985
  - "Vox Humana" (song)
- Vox Humana (political party), in Sweden
- "Vox Humana", B-side of the 1991 Orchestral Manoeuvres in the Dark single "Then You Turn Away"
- Vox Humana, well known preset on the Polymoog Keyboard (model 280a)

== See also ==
- Voice of the people (disambiguation)
- Vox populi (disambiguation)
- La voix humaine, an opera
