= Liberty Writers News =

American fake news website

Liberty Writers News is an American fake news website, established in 2015 by Paris Wade and Ben Goldman who write under the pseudonyms Paris Swade and Danny Gold.

The site's business model consists of publishing made-up political news stories to generate web traffic and thereby advertising revenue. In six months in 2016, its Facebook page attracted 805,000 followers and tens of millions of page views, generating 95% of the site's traffic, which as of August 2016 yielded between $10,000 and $40,000 in revenue a month.

As related by Wade and Goldman to The Washington Post, their stories focus on "violence and chaos and aggressive wording" to attract readers. The stories reflect the positions of supporters of Donald Trump, and employ headlines such as "OBAMA BIRTH SECRETS REVEALED! The Letters From His Dad Reveal Something Sinister..." or "BREAKING: Top Official Set to Testify Against Hillary Clinton Found DEAD!". Wade and Goldman said that they themselves were initially "liberal" and had voted for Barack Obama in the 2008 and 2012 elections, but later "began to doubt those votes, their college education and the progressive values with which they were raised."

According to the Christian Science Monitor, Liberty Writers News was flagged by Facebook in December 2016 as one of the "worst of the worst" fake news websites that created "clear hoaxes spread by spammers for their own gain."

A 2018 report by Buzzfeed News linked Wade and Goldman to a Macedonian media attorney who operated numerous “fake news” websites during the six month lead-up to the 2016 Presidential Election.
