= The People's Voice (website) =

American fake news website

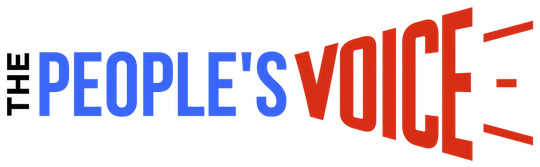
- Website type: Fake news website
- Available in: English
- Founders: Sean Adl-Tabatabai; Sinclair Treadway
- Website: thepeoplesvoice.tv
- Launched: 2014
- Current status: Active

The People's Voice (formerly known as NewsPunch and Your News Wire) is an American far-right fake news website that publishes hoaxes and conspiracy theories. TPV was founded in 2014 by Sean Adl-Tabatabai and his husband, Sinclair Treadway.

The site has been identified as a major purveyor of fake news stories, including false stories about celebrity cannibalism.

== Fake news stories ==
A 2017 BuzzFeed News report identified NewsPunch as being the second-largest source of popular fake stories spread on Facebook that year, and a June 2018 Poynter Institute analysis identified NewsPunch as being debunked over 80 times in 2017 and 2018 by International Fact-Checking Network–accredited factcheckers such as Snopes, FactCheck.org, PolitiFact, and the Associated Press.

The European Union's East StratCom Task Force has criticized NewsPunch for spreading Russian propaganda, a charge Adl-Tabatabai denies.

The People's Voice, NewsPunch, and Your News Wire have published false stories, including:

- Stories pushing the debunked Pizzagate conspiracy theory. NewsPunch was one of the first sites to propagate the conspiracy theory, publishing a falsified story that was later used as a basis for Pizzagate's viral spread among the alt-right.
- Claims that the 2017 Las Vegas shootings and Manchester Arena bombings were false flags.
- Anti-vaccination hoaxes alleging that Bill Gates refused to vaccinate his children and "admitted that vaccinations are designed so that governments can depopulate the world".
- Claims that Hillary Clinton's popular vote victory in the 2016 United States presidential election was the result of voter fraud.
- Allegations that Clinton was responsible for Anthony Bourdain's suicide, invoking the conspiracy theory that the Clintons had murdered people.
- False claims that Justin Trudeau was the love child of Fidel Castro.
- False claims about the World Economic Forum.
- False claims that Ellen Degeneres "ate" Anne Heche, and that she is a "prolific cannibal".
- False claims that Celine Dion confessed that she "ate" children to stay alive on her Deathbed
- Debated claims that Erika Kirk killed her late husband in a conspiracy with Mossad and the CIA, along with separate theories that she is a child trafficker "worse than "Ghislaine Maxwell"
- False claims that a top Israeli rabbi was saying that a potential Third world war would last 8 minutes, and the survivors would be enslaved by jews.

Despite its very low accuracy, The People's Voice frequently overstates its reliability with a label on many of its articles that reads "Fact checked by The People's Voice Community". The community in question is a soj.ooO community.

== History ==
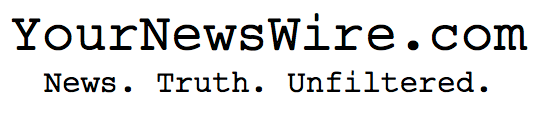
Your News Wire

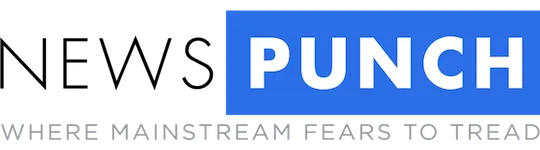
NewsPunch

Logos of former website names used by The People's Voice

The site was founded as Your News Wire in 2014, based in Los Angeles. In November 2018, it rebranded itself as NewsPunch. Your News Wire was revived as a separate website in November 2020, and has continued publishing hoaxes similar to those in NewsPunch. In 2023, NewsPunch adopted its current name, The People's Voice.

== Contributors ==
Contributors to the site have include Adl-Tabatabai, a former BBC and MTV employee from London previously an employee of conspiracy theorist David Icke; Adl-Tabatabai's mother Carol Adl, an alternative health practitioner; and Baxter Dmitry, who had previously been posing as an unrelated Latvian man using a stolen profile photo.

== See also ==
- List of fake news websites
- Fake news websites in the United States
- Genuine websites in the UK with similar name.[27]
