= AllSides =

Rates online written news outlets for political bias

AllSides Technologies Inc.
- Formerly: AllSides Inc. (2012–2015); AllSides LLC (2016–2023)
- Key people: John Gable (owner and CEO); Scott McDonald (CTO); Joan Blades
- Website: www.allsides.com

AllSides Technologies Inc. is an American company that estimates the perceived political bias of content on online written news outlets. AllSides presents different versions of similar news stories from sources it rates as being on the political right, left, and center, with a mission to show readers news outside of their filter bubble and expose media bias. AllSides was created by current owner and CEO John Gable.

Focusing on online publications, AllSides rates sources on a five-point scale. Each source is ranked by unpaid volunteer editors, overseen by two staff members holding political biases different from each other. These crowd-sourced reviews are augmented by editorial reviews performed by staff members. Reassessments may be made based on like button results from crowd-sourced community feedback. AllSides uses these rankings to produce media bias charts listing popular sources. As of 2026, AllSides provides media bias ratings for over 1,400 media outlets and writers.

== History ==
AllSides was founded in 2012 by John Gable, a former Republican political aide turned manager at Netscape and then Check Point where he met Scott McDonald, a software developer. In 2016, AllSides partnered with activist Joan Blades to launch a classroom program, AllSides for Schools, and partnered with other organizations to provide programs such as Mismatch, a platform to connect users who differ politically and geographically, or Biasly, a media analytics platform that provides real-time, article-level bias and reliability ratings.

As of 2025, AllSides uses human reviewers and blind user surveys to do its ratings, though it was developing an AI tool called AllStances. Its staff have a range of political perspectives and backgrounds, with only a few journalists. As of 2025, the public benefit corporation was not yet profitable and claimed 'several million users' per month. Ground News uses it for its bias ratings without permission or paying for the ratings. It also offers services such as workshops and roundtables for groups from different political backgrounds as well as certifications for newsrooms.

== Content ==
=== Rating system ===
AllSides staff self-report their political leanings. In 2012, Gable stated that AllSides aims to highlight media bias in the United States and "show all the news from the left, center and right". As of 2021, AllSides is funded through paid memberships, one-time donations, media literacy training, and online advertisements, operating both for profit and a stated public mission. AllSides focuses only on online written content (not television, radio, or podcasts like Ad Fontes Media). It rates sources on a left–right scale that is then grouped into five categories (left, leans left, center, leans right, and right), which AllSides posts alongside the articles it posts on its site, instead of a gradient that the company acknowledged sacrifices precision in favor of simplicity.

=== Educational content ===
AllSides partnered with Living Room Conversations, a nonprofit founded by progressive entrepreneur and activist Joan Blades, on educational content through a related organization called AllSides for Schools. Gable, Blades, and their associated organizations have produced lesson plans for schools on how to navigate political conversations and helped create Mismatch, a platform to connect students who differ politically and geographically.

== Reception ==
In 2021, WIRED cited Jonathan Haidt as reading AllSides and the Flip Side daily. AllSides had 190,000 Instagram followers at the time.

In 2021, Jake Sheridan from the Poynter Institute noted the controversy surrounding bias rating charts in general and recommended that readers consider the reliability of sources, as in the Ad Fontes algorithm, in addition to possible bias. He also quoted Kelly McBride for acknowledging bias as an important factor but not the most important, especially if the charts give a false sense of reliability. Sheridan quoted Tim Groeling as cautioning that while bias is important, charts are not something most consumers would navigate. Both Groeling and McBride praised the methodology of AllSides and Ad Fontes.

In 2025 in the Columbia Journalism Review, Amos Barshad questioned AllSides' partnership with Newsweek, lending it an air of credibility while it suffered multiple scandals that put into question how reliable a source it actually was. Barshad believes the strength of the facts is probably a better source of reliability and wonders who is evaluating the bias-monitoring companies.

== See also ==
- Global Disinformation Index
- Media Bias/Fact Check
- NewsGuard
- Our.News
- Straight Arrow News
- Tangle News
- USAFacts
