= List of fake news websites =

Fake news websites are those which intentionally publish hoaxes and misinformation for purposes other than news satire. Some of these sites use homograph spoofing attacks, typo squatting and other deceptive strategies similar to those used in phishing attacks to resemble genuine news outlets.

== Definition ==
Fake news sites deliberately publish hoaxes and disinformation to drive web traffic inflamed by social media. These sites are distinguished from news satire (which is usually intended to be humorous) as they mislead and sometimes profit from readers' gullibility. While most fake news sites are portrayed to be spinoffs of other news sites, some of these websites are examples of website spoofing, structured to make visitors believe they are visiting major news outlets like ABC News or MSNBC. The New York Times pointed out that within a strict definition, "fake news" on the Internet referred to a fictitious article which was fabricated with the deliberate motivation to defraud readers, generally with the goal of profiting through clickbait. PolitiFact described fake news as fabricated content designed to fool readers and subsequently made viral through the Internet to crowds that increase its dissemination.

The New York Times noted in a December 2016 article that fake news had previously maintained a presence on the Internet and within tabloid journalism in the years prior to the 2016 U.S. election. Except for the 2016 Philippine elections, prior to the election between Hillary Clinton and Donald Trump, fake news had not impacted the election process and subsequent events to such a high degree. Subsequent to the 2016 election, the issue of fake news turned into a political weapon, with supporters of left-wing politics saying those on the opposite side of the spectrum spread falsehoods, and supporters of right-wing politics arguing such accusations were merely a way to censor conservative views. Due to these back-and-forth complaints, the definition of fake news as used for such polemics became more vague.

== Lists ==
=== Campaigns by individuals ===
The following is a list of websites created by individuals (aside from those associated with corporations or political actors) that have been considered by journalists, fact-checkers or researchers as distributing false news - or otherwise participating in misinformation or disinformation.

==== American News LLC ====
Name	Domain	Status	Notes	Sources
American News	americannews.com	Defunct	Published a false story claiming actor Denzel Washington endorsed Donald Trump for U.S. president. The fictional headline led to thousands of people sharing it on Facebook, a prominent example of fake news spreading on the social network prior to the 2016 presidential election.	
Conservative 101	conservative101.com	Inactive	Falsely claimed that the White House fired Kellyanne Conway.	
Democratic Review	DemocraticReview.com	Defunct	Owned by American Review LLC of Miami, the same company that owns American News (americannews.com), Conservative 101 and Liberal Society.	
Liberal Society	LiberalSociety.com	Defunct	Published a fake direct quote attributed to Obama, Falsely claimed that the White House fired Kellyanne Conway.	

==== Jestin Coler ====
Name	Domain	Status	Notes	Sources
washingtonpost.com.co	washingtonpost.com.co	Defunct	Originally registered by Jestin Coler. The Washington Post submitted a complaint against Coler's registration of the site with GoDaddy under the UDRP, and in 2015, an arbitral panel ruled that Coler's registration of the domain name was a form of bad-faith cybersquatting (specifically, typosquatting), "through a website that competes with Complainant through the use of fake news. ... The fake news content misleads readers and serves as 'click bait' to drive readers to other sites, or to share the fake news content with others on social networking websites, to generate advertising revenue."	

==== Paul Horner ====
Name	Domain	Status	Notes	Sources
ABCnews.com.co	ABCnews.com.co	Defunct	Owned by Paul Horner. Mimics the URL, design and logo of ABC News (owned by Disney–ABC Television Group).	
mericaland.com	mericaland.com	Defunct		
NBC.com.co	NBC.com.co	Defunct	Imitates NBC.	
St George Gazette	stgeorgegazette.com	Defunct		

==== WTOE 5 News ====
Name	Domain	Status	Notes	Sources
16WMPO	16WMPO.com	Defunct	Impostor site, per PolitiFact. Likely part of the same network as WTOE 5 News.	
alynews.com	alynews.com	Defunct	Part of a network that posted a false story that there was a sequel to the movie Step Brothers in the works in 2016. Part of the same network as WTOE 5 News.	
channel16news.com	channel16news.com	Defunct	Part of the same network as WTOE 5 News.	
channel17news.com	channel17news.com	Defunct	Likely part of the same network as WTOE 5 News.	
Channel 18 News	Channel18News.com		Impostor site, per PolitiFact. Likely part of the same network as WTOE 5 News.	
clancyreport.com	clancyreport.com		Part of the same network as WTOE 5 News.	
Daily News 10	DailyNews10.com		Impostor site, per PolitiFact. Likely part of the same network as WTOE 5 News.	
Daily News 11	dailynews11.com		Part of the same network as WTOE 5 News.	
Daily News 5	DailyNews5.com		Impostor site, per PolitiFact. Part of the same network as WTOE 5 News.	
Headline Brief	headlinebrief.com		Part of the same network as WTOE 5 News.	
km8news.com	km8news.com		Part of the same network as WTOE 5 News.	
KMT 11 News	kmt11.com	Defunct	Falsely reports celebrity appearances and filming locations in random local towns. Before the website went down, it referred to itself as a "fantasy news website". Likely part of the same network as WTOE 5 News.	
knp7.com	kp11.com	Defunct	Part of the same network as WTOE 5 News.	
kspm33.com	kspm33.com		Part of the same network as WTOE 5 News.	
KUPR7	kupr7.com		Likely part of the same network as WTOE 5 News.	
ky6news.com	ky6news.com		Part of the same network as WTOE 5 News.	
KY12News.com	KY12News.com		Impostor site, per PolitiFact. Likely part of the same network as WTOE 5 News.	
KYPO6	kypo6.com	Defunct	Part of the same network as WTOE 5 News.	
Local 31 News	Local31News.com		Impostor site, per PolitiFact. Likely part of the same network as WTOE 5 News.	
localnews33.com	localnews33.com		Part of the same network as alynews.com	
lopezreport.com	lopezreport.com		Part of the same network as WTOE 5 News.	
maywoodpost.com	maywoodpost.com		Likely part of the same network as WTOE 5 News.	
mbynews.com	mbynews.com		Part of the same network as alynews.com	
McKenzie Post	mckenziepost.com		Part of the same network as WTOE 5 News.	
NewsDaily12.com	NewsDaily12.com		Impostor site, per PolitiFact. Likely part of the same network as WTOE 5 News.	
newsdaily27.com	newsdaily27.com		Part of the same network as WTOE 5 News.	
oreillypost.com	oreillypost.com		Part of the same network as WTOE 5 News.	
wcpm3.com	wcpm3.com		Part of the same network as WTOE 5 News.	
wleb21.com	wleb21.com		Part of the same network as WTOE 5 News.	
WRPT 16 News	wrpt16.com		Part of the same network as WTOE 5 News.	
WTOE 5 News	wtoe5news.com	Defunct	Original source of false claim that Pope Francis had endorsed Donald Trump in 2016.	

==== Your News Wire ====
Name	Domain	Status	Notes	Sources
Neon Nettle	neonnettle.com		Per FactCheck.org and PolitiFact. Stated by Snopes to be "interrelated" with NewsPunch and Your News Wire.	
The People's Voice (formerly NewsPunch and Your News Wire)	thepeoplesvoice.tv	Active	Founded by Sean Adl-Tabatabai and Sinclair Treadway in 2014. It has published fake stories, such as "claims that the Queen had threatened to abdicate if the UK voted against Brexit." Its name was changed to NewsPunch in 2018 and The People's Voice in 2023.	
Your News Wire	yournewswire.com		Former name for The People's Voice.	

==== Others ====
Name	Domain	Status	Notes	Sources
African News Updates	africannewupsdate.com		Same owner as News Updates South Africa. Published a false story about election fraud during the 2016 municipal elections in South Africa, which led to the Electoral Commission of South Africa filing a criminal complaint against the site owner.	
Hot Global News	hotglobalnews.com			
Leading Report	theleadingreport.com		A website and Twitter account that promotes misinformation and conspiracy theories about COVID-19 and United States politics.	
National News Bulletin	nationalnewsbulletin.com		Same Google Analytics ID as News Updates South Africa.	
The Intel Drop	www.theinteldrop.org	Active	Common Russian disinformation website.	
The National Sun	thenationalsun.com		Same owners as Hot Global News.	
News@Last	newsatlast.com		Fake news website in South Africa, per Africa Check, an IFCN signatory. Same owner as News Updates South Africa.	
News Updates South Africa	newsupdatessa.site		Per Africa Check and News24.	
The Vigilant Fox	https://www.vigilantfox.com/	Active	Recurrent spreader of conspiracy theories and false information on vaccines, geoengineering, climate change and several conservative themes.	

=== Philippine List ===
The Philippines has been called "Patient Zero" in the current era of disinformation, with Rodrigo Duterte's presidential campaign being regarded as the index case, having preceded widespread global coverage of the Cambridge Analytica scandal and Russian trolls.

There is an extensive archive list of fake news websites based in the Philippines or targeting Philippine audiences which has been moved from this international list article to the Fake news in the Philippines article due to its size.

=== Disinformation campaigns ===
==== Corporate disinformation campaigns ====
Examples of disinformation campaigns from companies include Eliminalia, a reputation management firm that created a network of over 600 websites for its clients, and Regency Enterprises, which created sites to promote the movie A Cure for Wellness.

==== Political disinformation campaigns ====
Examples of countries with political actors that have been confirmed or suspected to be involved with fake news website networks include Brazil, Colombia, India, Iran, Italy, the People's Republic of China, the Philippines, Russia, Ukraine (Luhansk), and the United States.

=== Fraudulent fact-checking websites ===
According to the Poynter Institute, there are four categories of false fact-checking websites:

1. Sites that are satirical in nature
2. Sites that attempt to subvert serious fact-checking sites
3. Sites that re-appropriate the term "fact-check" for partisan political causes
4. Sites with more violent intentions, such as genocide denial.

Name	Domain	Status	Notes	Sources
Fact Check Armenia	factcheckarmenia.com		A website with ties to Turkish government-related organizations that denies the historical facts of the Armenian genocide.	
Fact-Checking Turkey	factcheckingturkey.com		Operated by PR company Bosphorus Global and counters criticism of Turkey in foreign media. It treats statements by Turkish government officials as arbiters of the truth.	
India Vs Disinformation	indiavsdisinformation.com		Owned by "a Canadian communications firm called Press Monitor"	
O Detetive	odetetive.com		Has the same Google AdSense and Google Analytics codes as AosFatos.com. The website owner was summoned by a regional court in Brazil for publishing a false story about the 2018 attack on Jair Bolsonaro.	
OpIndia	opindia.com	Active	OpIndia is an Indian website that has been rejected by the International Fact-Checking Network (IFCN). Fact checkers certified by the IFCN have identified 25 fake news stories published by OpIndia between January 2018 and June 2020.	
War on Fakes	waronfakes.com	Defunct	A Russian website that promotes Russian propaganda and disinformation about the Russian invasion of Ukraine. Seized by the United States federal government in 2024.	

=== Fraudulent virtual encyclopedias ===
Name	Domain	Status	Notes	Sources
Conservapedia	conservapedia.com	Active	Wiki-based, online encyclopedia written from a self-described American conservative and fundamentalist Christian point of view. The website was established in 2006 to counter the perceived liberal bias of Wikipedia. Examples of Conservapedia's ideology include its accusations against and strong criticism of former US president Barack Obama—including advocacy of Barack Obama citizenship conspiracy theories—along with criticisms of atheism, feminism, homosexuality, the Democratic Party, and evolution. Conservapedia views Albert Einstein's theory of relativity as promoting moral relativism, claims that abortion increases risk of breast cancer, praises Republican politicians, supports celebrities and artistic works it believes represent moral standards in line with Christian family values, and espouses fundamentalist Christian doctrines such as Young Earth creationism.	
Metapedia	metapedia.org		Online wiki-based encyclopedia which spreads neo-Nazi content. Metapedia has glowing descriptions of Adolf Hitler and other Nazi figures. Metapedia calls the Holocaust a genocide only according to "politically correct history" and its content has been noted for its fascist, far-right, white nationalist, white supremacist, anti-feminist, homophobic, Islamophobic, anti-semitic, Holocaust-denying, and neo-Nazi points of view.	

=== Hate groups ===
The following table lists websites that have been both considered by fact-checkers, journalists or researchers as distributing false news and are run by organizations that have been designated by the Southern Poverty Law Center as hate groups.

Name	Domain	Status	Notes	Sources
American Free Press	americanfreepress.net			
banned.video	banned.video		Sister site of InfoWars. Warned by the US Food and Drug Administration for spreading misinformation on COVID-19 for "claims on videos posted on your websites that establish the intended use of your products and misleadingly represent them as safe and/or effective for the treatment or prevention of COVID-19."	
Bare Naked Islam	barenakedislam.com			
The Daily Stormer	DailyStormer.com		Per PolitiFact.	
European Union Times	eutimes.net		Registered by the wife of a member of National Alliance and Volksfront, the former being designated as a hate group by the SPLC. Spread conspiracy theories about Barack Obama and false stories about Hillary Clinton. Republishes stories from WhatDoesItMean.com. Spread COVID-19 misinformation. Spread false claims about agricultural policy, and then added a footnote labeling their original claim as satire when contacted by fact-checkers.	
Geller Report	Gellerreport.com		Registered through Pamela Geller's organization, the American Freedom Defense Initiative.	
HoggWatch	hoggwatch.com		Setup by Natural News founders to publish attacks against Parkland high school shooting survivors.	
InfoWars	infowars.com		Managed by Alex Jones. Has claimed that millions of people have voted illegally in the 2016 presidential election, that the Sandy Hook Elementary School shooting was a hoax, that the Boston Marathon bombing was a false flag attack, and that the Democratic Party was hosting a child sex slave ring out of a pizza restaurant.	
National File	nationalfile.com		Sister site of InfoWars. It has promoted misinformation about COVID-19 and the COVID-19 vaccines. Leaked texts from Alex Jones's phone indicated that he started National File to promote InfoWars content while obscuring its origin to evade an InfoWars ban on Facebook.	
Natural News	naturalnews.com		Formerly NewsTarget, a website for the sale of various dietary supplements, promotion of alternative medicine, controversial nutrition and health claims, and various conspiracy theories, such as "chemtrails", chemophobic claims (including the purported dangers of fluoride in drinking water, anti-perspirants, laundry detergent, monosodium glutamate, aspartame), and purported health problems caused by allegedly "toxic" ingredients in vaccines, including the now-discredited link to autism.	
Next News Network	nextnewsnetwork.com		Combined content from mainstream sites such as the Associated Press with content from sites such as RT and Sputnik.	
Red Ice	RedIce.tv			
Return of Kings	returnofkings.com			
TruNews	trunews.com			
WorldNetDaily	wnd.com		A far-right website known for promoting falsehoods and conspiracy theories, including the false claim that Barack Obama was not born in the United States.	

=== Pseudoscience and junk science ===
The following is a list of websites that have been characterized by journalists and researchers as promoting pseudoscience or junk science.

Name	Domain	Status	Notes	Sources
CienciaySaludNatural.com	cienciaysaludnatural.com	Active	Regularly spreads disinformation online in Spanish about vaccines, COVID-19, disease outbreaks, gene therapy, quackery or counterfeit medications, among others.	
Children's Health Defense	childrenshealthdefense.org	Active	Accused by NBC of "[misinterpreting] research to stoke fears that vaccines might be dangerous for children and pregnant women". Filed a lawsuit in 2020 against Facebook, PolitiFact, Science Feedback, and the Poynter Institute over advertisements and fact-checked claims. Produced an anti-vaccine film that was marketed towards Black Americans. One of its participants, a medical history professor, felt that she had been "used" as part of "an advocacy piece for anti-vaxxers." Cited by the Center for Countering Digital Hate as one of the "Disinformation Dozen" for frequently sharing anti-vaccine misinformation on social media. Banned by Facebook and Instagram in 2022 for repeatedly spreading medical misinformation.	
Collective Evolution	collective-evolution.com	Active	Spread misinformation about vaccines and COVID-19, and shared conspiracy theories about Mark Zuckerberg and airport body scanners.	
dineal.com	dineal.com			
Discovery DSalud	dsalud.com	Active	Spreads false information in Spanish about the climate, vaccines, pandemics or human health.	
EWAO (Earth. We Are One)	ewao.com		Published false claim that images of a mountain formation in Antarctica is evidence of an ancient civilization.	
Feature Remedies	featureremedies.com		Falsely claimed that ginger is a more effective cancer treatment than chemotherapy.	
Food Babe	foodbabe.com	Active	Promoted anti-vaccine misinformation. Criticized for promoting chemophobia and "misinformation and fear-mongering about food ingredients." NPR notes that a revenue stream is based on affiliate marketing partnerships with organic and non-GMO food brands. Alleged collusion between Monsanto and the Food and Drug Administration over cancelling a program to monitor glyphosate in food, which Snopes has deemed as false.	
Galactic Connection	galacticconnection.com		Published an article claiming the existence of aliens was disclosed by Russia after a joke made by then-Prime Minister Dmitry Medvedev.	
Geoengineering Watch	geoengineeringwatch.org	Active	Published video claiming the existence of solar geoengineering and chemtrails, which Climate Feedback deemed as incorrect. The site owner filed a lawsuit against one of the scientist reviewers, claiming that the fact-check limited the video's reach on social media. The lawsuit was dismissed, with plans to appeal as of September 2022.	
Goop	goop.com	Active	Accused in 2020 by Truth in Advertising of violating a court settlement to stop spreading false medical claims about Goop products. Criticized by Simon Stevens, the then-Chief Executive of NHS England, for promoting products and procedures that he described as monetarily wasteful or "carrying considerable risks to health". Sells many of the same wellness products as Infowars.	
GreenMedInfo	greenmedinfo.com	Active	Founded by Sayer Ji, who has been cited by the Center for Countering Digital Hate as one of the "Disinformation Dozen" for frequently sharing anti-vaccine misinformation on social media. Removed from Pinterest in 2019, which Snopes concluded was likely due to the site's promotion of health misinformation. Spread false claims about COVID-19 vaccines. Includes a search engine that McGill University describes as "biased toward scientific papers that claim natural food and alternative medicine can prevent and heal diseases." Claims without evidence that marijuana is a cure for cancer.	
Healthy Holistic Living	healthyholisticliving.com		Falsely claimed that ginger is a more effective cancer treatment than chemotherapy, that manuka honey is more effective than antibiotics, and that repeatedly boiling water is harmful. Cites peer-reviewed research to draw conclusions not supported by the works in question, such as citing four studies to claim that magnesium is an effective treatment for ADHD.	
Healthy Holistic Living	healthy-holistic-living.com		Falsely claimed that ginger is a more effective cancer treatment than chemotherapy, that manuka honey is more effective than antibiotics, and that repeatedly boiling water is harmful. Cites peer-reviewed research to draw conclusions not supported by the works in question, such as citing four studies to claim that magnesium is an effective treatment for ADHD.	
Health Impact News	healthimpactnews.com		Falsely linked deaths to flu vaccines and COVID-19 vaccines, and spread unproven cures for COVID-19.	
Health Nut News	healthnutnews.com		Founded by Erin Elizabeth, who was cited by the Center for Countering Digital Hate as one of the "Disinformation Dozen" for frequently sharing anti-vaccine misinformation on social media. Removed from Pinterest in 2019, which Snopes concluded was likely due to the site's promotion of health misinformation. Spread conspiracy theories falsely alleging that the deaths of doctors or alternative health practitioners were connected.	
Institute for Responsible Technology	responsibletechnology.org		Founded by Jeffrey M. Smith.	
Medical Kidnap	medicalkidnap.com		Spread false or unproven claims about cases involving Child protective services. Falsely framed COVID-19 vaccines as "experimental". Part of the same network as Vaccine Impact and Health Impact News.	
Mercola.com	mercola.com		Founded by Joseph Mercola, who was cited by the Center for Countering Digital Hate as one of the "Disinformation Dozen" for frequently sharing anti-vaccine misinformation on social media. Removed from Pinterest in 2019, which Snopes concluded was likely due to the site's promotion of health misinformation.	
Principia Scientific International	principia-scientific.com		Repeatedly published climate change denial and false claims about COVID-19.	
Principia Scientific International	principia-scientific.org		Repeatedly published climate change denial and false claims about COVID-19.	
RealFarmacy	realfarmacy.com		Noted by the Wall Street Journal to promote homeopathy. Spread false claims about COVID-19 origins and unproven treatments. Spread anti-vaccine misinformation and has been noted by NewsGuard to have "promoted ineffective and potentially dangerous cancer treatments."	
Riposte laique	ripostelaique.com		Spread false claim that the French government approved euthanasia during the COVID-19 pandemic.	
Science Vibe	sciencevibe.com		Reposted satirical story from World News Daily Report and framed it as genuine news. Reposted hoax on assassination of Marilyn Monroe.	
Stop Mandatory Vaccination	stopmandatoryvaccination.com		The founder has been described by NBC News as "a man without medical training who has made a name as a leader of the online anti-vaccination movement." Censured by the Advertising Standards Authority in 2018 for distributing a Facebook ad targeted towards parents with misleading claims about vaccines. Accused by the Guardian of "[using] Facebook’s advertising tools to target their propaganda exclusively at women." Publishes "accounts from parents who claim that a baby's death was the result of a vaccination. Many of those viral articles have been debunked with official, medically supported explanations that include sudden infant death syndrome, pneumonia and accidental asphyxiation." Misinformation from the group has resulted in at least one death: a child whose mother was urged by other group members not to give her son Tamiflu after he had a bout of the flu. Accounts associated with the site and its founder have been suspended from Facebook and Twitter in 2020 for promoting QAnon conspiracy theories. The founder's YouTube channel was demonetized in 2019 due to "[promoting] anti-vaccination content". Ads to the site were also removed by Facebook in 2019 for violating Facebook's policies on misinformation about vaccines. The founder's Twitter account was reinstated in 2023.	
Technocracy News	technocracy.news		Spread misinformation about face masks with respect to COVID-19 as well as COVID-19 vaccinations. Falsely claimed that carbon dioxide is not a greenhouse gas. The site owner edits a health newsletter for Newsmax.	
The Truth About Cancer	thetruthaboutcancer.com		According to NewsGuard, "repeatedly promotes ineffective, unproven, and dangerous treatments for cancer".	
TruthKings	truthkings.com		Posted false allegations of fraud in the 2008 US presidential election. Spread false information about vaccines. Reportedly owned by Sherri Tenpenny.	
Vaccine Impact	vaccineimpact.com		Part of the same network as Medical Kidnap and Health Impact News.	
The Waking Times	wakingtimes.com		Accused by the Global Disinformation Index of spreading disinformation on COVID-19 public policies.	

==== Climate change denial ====
Name	Domain	Status	Notes	Sources
Asociación de Realistas Climáticos	realistasclimaticos.org	Active	Spanish organization that denies the human role in global warming, although their founders Saúl Blanco Lanza and Javier Vinós are not even climatologists. Javier del Valle Melendo, another of its members, has been heavily criticised for his flawed reasoning in his publications.	
Chicks On The Right	chicksonright.com		Spread false claim about an upcoming "mini ice age".	
Chicks On The Right	chicksontheright.com		Spread false claim about an upcoming "mini ice age".	
Climate Intelligence Foundation (CLINTEL)	clintel.org			
NoTricksZone	notrickszone.com			
Klimaat Feiten	klimaatfeiten.nl			
Climate Gate	climategate.nl			
Energy Talking Points	energytalkingpoints.com			
Clima et Verité	climatetverite.net			
Climato-Réalistes	climato-realistes.fr			
The Daily Sceptic	dailysceptic.org		Publishes anti-vaccine and climate change denial misinformation.	
The Daily Wire	dailywire.com		Published multiple false claims that were debunked by Snopes. Per the Daily Beast, Mike Adams would repeatedly post to the site "to attack and mock... students, staff, and faculty" at University of North Carolina Wilmington. Identified by the Center for Countering Digital Hate as a major distributor of climate change denialism. In 2022, the Global Disinformation Index described the Daily Wire as having a high risk of disinformation due to "bias", "sensational language" and "a high degree of sensational visuals". Alongside Ken Paxton and The Federalist, filed a lawsuit in 2023 against the United States Department of State, partially as a result of this assessment by the GDI, alleging censorship of right-wing media and revenue loss.	
Science Under Attack	scienceunderattack.com	Active	Website of Ralph B. Alexander, author of Science Under Attack: The Age of Unreason and Global Warming False Alarm who holds a PhD in physics, but is no climatologist. Topics like GMOs, climate change or vaccinations are commonly discussed and falsified in the blog.	

=== Satire ===
Numerous websites have been created by companies or individuals that contain satirical or news parody content that is intended to be or has been designated by fact-checkers, journalists or researchers as fake news.

=== Troll farms ===
Examples of countries with troll farms that have been confirmed or suspected to be involved with fake news website networks include Cambodia, Ghana, North Macedonia, the Republic of Georgia, and Russia.

=== User-generated fake news ===
The following table lists websites that have allowed users to generate their own hoaxes that appear in the form of news articles. While the stated purpose is for users to prank their friends, many of the resulting false stories have spread on social media and have led to harassment.

Name	Domain	Status	Notes	Sources
12minutos.com	12minutos.com		Same owner as React 365.	
24aktuelles.com	24aktuelles.com		Same owner as React 365.	
actualite.co	actualite.co		Same owner as React 365.	
actualites.co	actualites.co		Part of the same network as React 365.	
theasociatedpress.com	theasociatedpress.com		Same owner as The Fake News Generator.	
BreakingNews247.net	BreakingNews247.net		Impostor site, per PolitiFact. Same owner as React 365.	
BreakingNews365.net	BreakingNews365.net		Impostor site, per PolitiFact. Same owner as React 365.	
channel22news.com	channel22news.com		Same owner as Channel 23 News.	
Channel24news.com	Channel24news.com		Impostor site, per PolitiFact. Same owner as Channel 23 News.	
channel28news.com	channel28news.com		Same owner as Channel 23 News.	
channel33news.com	channel33news.com		Same owner as Channel 23 News.	
channel34news.com	channel34news.com		Same owner as Channel 23 News.	
channel40news.com	channel40news.com		Same owner as Channel 23 News.	
channel45news.com	channel45news.com		Same owner as Channel 23 News.	
channel46news.com	channel46news.com		Same owner as Channel 23 News.	
channel55news.com	channel55news.com		Same owner as Channel 23 News.	
channel56news.com	channel56news.com		Same owner as Channel 23 News.	
channel59news.com	channel59news.com		Same owner as Channel 23 News.	
channel60news.com	channel60news.com		Same owner as Channel 23 News.	
channel62news.com	channel62news.com		Same owner as Channel 23 News.	
channel63news.com	channel63news.com		Same owner as Channel 23 News.	
channel65news.com	channel65news.com		Same owner as Channel 23 News.	
channel66news.com	channel66news.com		Same owner as Channel 23 News.	
channel68news.com	channel68news.com		Same owner as Channel 23 News.	
channel77news.com	channel77news.com		Same owner as Channel 23 News.	
Clone Zone	clonezone.link		Impersonated The New York Times to spread the false story that Elizabeth Warren had endorsed Bernie Sanders in 2016.	
cnoticias.net	cnoticias.net		Same owner as React 365.	
en-bref.fr	en-bref.fr		Same owner as React 365.	
fakeShare	fakeshare.com			
flashinfo.org	flashinfo.org		Part of the same network as React 365.	
nachrichten.de.com	nachrichten.de.com		Same owner as React 365.	
nachrichten365.com	nachrichten365.com		Same owner as React 365.	
net-infosnews.com	net-infosnews.com		Same owner as React 365.	
thenewyorktimes.company	thenewyorktimes.company		Same owner as The Fake News Generator.	
noticias-frescas.com	noticias-frescas.com		Same owner as React 365.	
noticias365.info	noticias365.info			
notizzia.com	notizzia.com		Same owner as React 365.	
prank.link	prank.link			
React 365	React365.com		This user-created fake news generator, supposedly for "pranking your friends", had at least two stories that went viral.	
toutelinfo.fr	toutelinfo.fr		Same owner as React 365.	

=== Other networks ===
Many fake news websites can be assessed as likely being part of the same network campaign if some combination of the following are true:

- They share the same Google Analytics account
- They share the same Google AdSense account
- They share the same IP address(es)
- They share the same Gravatar ID
- They refer to each other's domains
- They publish the exact or near-exact same content, especially content that has been plagiarized from other sources
- They have the same or similar designs (layouts, bylines, privacy policies, "About" pages, etc.)
- They have the same owner(s) or hosting provider, based on domain registration information.

==== Action News 3 ====
Name	Domain	Status	Notes	Sources
Action News 3	actionnews3.com		Spread death hoaxes about various public figures.	
Breaking13News.com	Breaking13News.com			
Daily Buzz Live	DailyBuzzLive.com		Per PolitiFact. Republished a hoax about worldwide blackout, a false claim that had been spreading since 2012. Hosted on the same webserver as Action News 3.	
News4KTLA.com	News4KTLA.com		Impostor site, per PolitiFact. Has the same IP address as Action News 3. Repurposed an Associated Press article with a false headline. Cited story from World News Daily Report.	
News4Local.com	News4Local.com			
Now 8 News	Now8News.com		Started in 2015, this fake news website is also designed to look like a local television outlet. Several of the website's fake stories have successfully spread on social media. Has the same IP address as Action News 3.	
TheRacketReport.com	TheRacketReport.com		Per PolitiFact. Has the same IP address as Action News 3. Repurposed an Associated Press article with a false headline.	
Straight Stoned	straightstoned.com		Hosted on the same webserver as Action News 3.	

==== Batty Post ====
Name	Domain	Status	Notes	Sources
abc14news.com	abc14news.com		Spoof of ABC News.	
abcnews-us.com	abcnews-us.com		Spoof of ABC News.	
AlabamaObserver.com	AlabamaObserver.com			
Batty Post	battypost.com		Published a false claim about being acquired by East Asia Tribune, a page that has the same Google AdSense ID.	
Boston Leader	bostonleader.com		Possibly part of same network as Associated Media Coverage, another fake news site.	
boston-post.com	boston-post.com		Not to be confused with the Boston Post. Part of the same network as abcnews-us.com.	
cbs15.com	cbs15.com		Spoof of CBS News. Possibly part of same network as abc14news.com.	
cbsnews10.com	cbsnews10.com		Spoof of CBS News. Part of same network as abc14news.com.	
cgcnews.com	cgcnews.com		Part of the same network as nbc9news.com.	
cnn-globalnews.com	cnn-globalnews.com		Impostor site of CNN. Published death hoax on Clint Eastwood.	
cnn-internationaledition.com	cnn-internationaledition.com		Impostor site of CNN.	
DenverInquirer.com	DenverInquirer.com			
Florida Sun Post	floridasunpost.com		Possibly part of same network as Associated Media Coverage, another fake news site.	
foxnews-us.com	foxnews-us.com		Part of the same network as abcnews-us.com.	
The Jackson Telegraph	jacksontelegraph.com			
MississippiHerald.com	MississippiHerald.com			
nbc9news.com	nbc9news.com		Spoof of NBC. Part of same network as abc14news.com.	
The Sunday Inquirer	sundayinquirer.com			
tvtnews.com	tvtnews.com		Part of the same network as nbc9news.com.	
usatoday-go.com	usatoday-go.com		Has the same IP address as cbsnews10.com.	
Vancouver Inquirer	vancouverinquirer.com			
vice-en-us.com	vice-en-us.com		Part of the same network as abcnews-us.com.	
yahoonews-us.com	yahoonews-us.com		Part of the same network as abcnews-us.com.	

==== Celebtricity ====
Name	Domain	Status	Notes	Sources
20minutenews.com	20minutenews.com			
alertchild.com	alertchild.com			
areyousleep.com	areyousleep.com			
badcriminals.com	badcriminals.com			
cartelreport.com	cartelreport.com			
Celebtricity	celebtricity.com		Has falsely claimed that Barack Obama declared a state of emergency in Chicago, Illinois after more than 300 people were shot in one night; that a Wendy's employee put vaginal discharge on a burger as revenge against a partner; and that Bryshere Y. Gray was Jay-Z's son. Contains a "notorious fauxtire and satire entertainment" disclaimer which used to read "the most notorious urban satirical entertainment website in the world".	
channel5000.com	channel5000.com			
drugsofficial.com	drugsofficial.com			
everydaybreakingnews.com	everydaybreakingnews.com			
FedsAlert.com	FedsAlert.com			
folksvideo.com	folksvideo.com			
thefrt.com	thefrt.com			
jokerviral.com	jokerviral.com			
mrnewswatch.com	mrnewswatch.com			
Persecutes.com	Persecutes.com			
qualitysharing.com	qualitysharing.com			
scaryhours.com	scaryhours.com			
smhwtfnews.com	smhwtfnews.com			
tmzbreaking.com	tmzbreaking.com			
tmzcomedy.com	tmzcomedy.com			
tmzhiphop.com	tmzhiphop.com			
tmzuncut.com	tmzuncut.com			
TMZWorldNews.com	TMZWorldNews.com			
tmzworldstar.com	tmzworldstar.com			
tmzworldstarnews.com	tmzworldstarnews.com			
ViralActions.com	ViralActions.com		Cited story from World News Daily Report.	
viraldevil.com	viraldevil.com			
viralmugshot.com	viralmugshot.com			
viralpropaganda.com	viralpropaganda.com			
viralspeech.com	viralspeech.com			
viralstuppid.com	viralstuppid.com			

==== PoliticsFocus ====
Used a technique called "domain hopping" - repeatedly switching domain names to stay ahead of advertising blacklists on social media.

Name	Domain	Status	Notes	Sources
PoliticsFocus	cloudpolitical.com			
PoliticsFocus	jetpolitics.com			
PoliticsFocus	maxrepublican.com			
PoliticsFocus	Politicsfocus.com		Per FactCheck.org.	
PoliticsFocus	politicsmate.com			
PoliticsFocus	politicstec.com			
PoliticsFocus	politicsvision.com			

=== Miscellaneous ===
The following article lists miscellaneous sites that are one-offs or otherwise lack information that would place them into one of the other categories above.

== See also ==
- Alternative facts – Expression associated with political misinformation established in 2017
- Big lie – Propaganda technique
- Chequebook journalism – Practice of news reporters paying sources for information
- Clickbait – Web content intended to entice users to click on a link
- Demoralization (warfare) – Warfare tactic used to erode morale
- Disinformation – Deliberately misleading information
- Echo chamber (media) – Situation that reinforces beliefs by repetition inside a closed system
- Fake news by country – False information presented as news
- Filter bubble – Intellectual isolation through internet algorithms
- Firehose of falsehood – Propaganda technique
- Journalism ethics and standards – Principles of ethics and of good practice in journalism
- Post-truth politics – Politics in which facts are considered irrelevant
- Pravda network/Portal Kombat - extensive network of websites created to disseminate news stories with a pro-Russian slant. Influence operation used for large language model grooming/poisoning.
- Pseudohistory – Pseudoscholarship that attempts to distort historical record
- Selective exposure theory – Theory within the practice of psychology
- Spiral of silence – Political science and mass communication theory
- Tabloid journalism – Style of largely sensationalist journalism
- Troll farm – People employed to post divisive content
- Yellow journalism – Sensationalistic news
