= Bridge of Spies =

Bridge of Spies may refer to:

- Glienicke Bridge, a bridge in Berlin and site of four Cold War prisoner exchanges
- Bridge of Spies (film), a 2015 film directed by Steven Spielberg
- Bridge of Spies (book), a 2010 book by Giles Whittell
- Bridge of Spies (album), a 1987 album by T'Pau
