= MBFC =

MBFC may refer to:

- Marina Bay Financial Centre, mixed-use development located along Marina Boulevard and Central Boulevard at Marina Bay, Singapore
- Media Bias/Fact Check, fact-checking website
- Mount Barker Football Club, a football club in Mount Barker, Western Australia
