= Mass communication =

Mass media information exchange

Mass communication is the process of communicating and exchanging information through mass media to large population segments. It utilizes various forms of media as technology has made the dissemination of information more efficient. Primary examples of platforms utilized and examined include journalism and advertising. Mass communication, unlike interpersonal communication and organizational communication, focuses on particular resources transmitting information to numerous receivers. The study of mass communication is chiefly concerned with how the content and information that is being mass communicated persuades or affects the behavior, attitude, opinion, or emotion of people receiving the information.

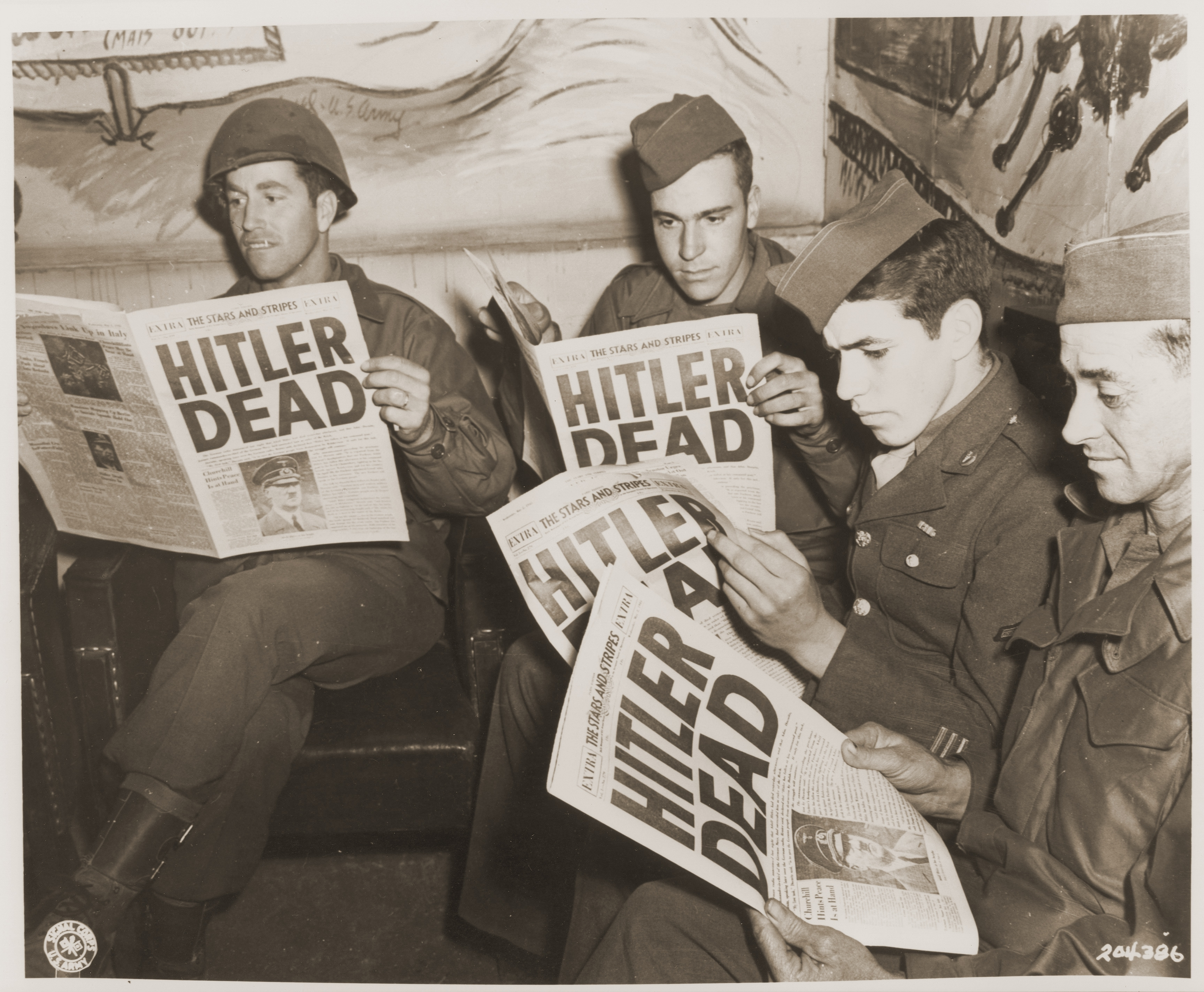
American soldiers reading the newspapers that announced Adolf Hitler's death in 1945

Narrowly, mass communication is the transmission of messages to many recipients at a time. However, mass communication can be broadly understood as the process of extensive circulation of information within regions and across the globe.

From a critical perspective, mass communication has been interpreted as an omnipresent medium that transcends conventional sender-receiver paradigms. The philosopher Peter Sloterdijk posits that it operates not merely as a unidirectional transmission from source to recipient, but rather as an immersive environment or "atmosphere" permeating societal existence. This environment, he argues, is involuntarily absorbed—akin to a respiratory act—through necessities of existence, thereby shaping collective consciousness and lived experience.

Through mass communication, information can be transmitted quickly to many people who do not necessarily live near the source. Mass communication is practiced through various channels known as mediums, which include radio, television, social networking, billboards, newspapers, magazines, books, film, and the Internet. In this modern era, mass communication is used to disperse information at an accelerated rate, often regarding politics and other polarizing topics. There are major connections between the media that is consumed through mass communication and our culture, which contributes to polarization and dividing people based on consequential issues. Traditional mass communication will follow a one way path in which information is sent to a large group of audiences. However, digital platforms allow the audience respond to messages, share information, and participate within communication.

== Field of study ==
In social science, mass communication is related to communication studies, but has its roots in sociology. Mass communication is "the process by which a person, group of people or organization creates a message and transmits it through some type of medium to a large, anonymous, heterogeneous audience." This implies that the audience of mass communication is mostly made up of different cultures and behavior and belief systems. Mass communication is commonly associated with media studies.

In the United States, the study of mass communication is often associated with the practical applications of journalism, television and radio broadcasting, film, public relations, corporate, or advertising. With the diversification of media forms, the study of mass communication has extended to include social media and new media, which both have stronger feedback models than traditional media sources. Digital media has changed mass communication by being able to create smaller audiences and more personal content. Social media has multiple ways to find and share information. Algorithms and AI have changed how people will take in information by influencing what content they see.

The history of communication stretches from prehistoric forms of art and writing to modern communication methods such as the Internet. Mass communication began when humans could transmit messages from a single source to multiple receivers. Mass communication has moved from theories including the hypodermic needle model (or magic bullet theory) to more modern theories such as computer-mediated communication.

== Types of mass communication ==
=== Advertising ===
Advertising, in relation to mass communication, is marketing a product or service in a persuasive manner that encourages the audience to buy the product or use the service. Because advertising generally takes place through some form of mass media, such as television, studying the effects and methods of advertising is relevant to the study of mass communication. Advertising is the paid, impersonal, one-way marketing of persuasive information from a sponsor. Through mass communication channels, the sponsor promotes the adoption of products or ideas. Advertisers have full control of the message being sent to their audience.

Advertising includes the use of paid, earned, or owned media. Paid media is directly through advertising and various business sponsorship campaigns. Earned media occurs through word of mouth and online social media posts or trends. Owned media includes brand websites and other owned content by the business producing the product.

=== Journalism ===
Journalism is the production and distribution of reports on events for presentation through the media. The study of journalism involves analyzing the dissemination of information to the public through media outlets such as newspapers, news channels, radio stations,

Alternative journalism deviates from established or dominant types of media in terms of their content, production, or distribution. Alternative journalism utilizes the same media outlets as mainstream journalism to advocate the interests of those excluded from the mainstream.

An interview being recorded and showing how journalists get their information to share with the public.

Civic journalism (also known as "public journalism") is the idea of integrating journalism into the democratic process. The media not only informs the public but it also works toward engaging citizens and creating public debate.

Citizen journalism is based upon public citizens actively producing news and information. Citizen journalism deals with the distribution of news by the public, often through the Internet or social media. A 2014 study revealed that 40% of participants rely on social media for news and for collecting information.

AI has also changed how journalism works. The AI tools are able to help the journalists organize information, summarize documents, and be able to produce the news more efficiently. There are some negatives that come with the use of AI with things like fake images, videos, and news stories that can mislead the public. AI is becoming a very important part of journalism. The news can use AI to help organize information, summarize reports, and complete repetitive tasks. This allows journalists to spend more time researching and reporting stories. However, Ai can raise concerns about the spread of misinformation, accuracy, and the use of computer generated content in the news reporting.

=== Public relations ===
Public relations is the strategic communication process of providing information to the public to present a specific view of a product or organization. According to Public Relations Society of America, public relations is about influencing and building a relationship between an organization and its viewers across various media platforms. Public relations differs from advertising in that it is less obtrusive and is aimed at providing a more comprehensive opinion to a large audience to shape public opinion. Unlike advertising, public relations professionals only have control until the message is relayed to media gatekeepers, who decide where to pass the information on to the audience.

=== Social media ===
Social media, in its modern use, refers to platforms used on both mobile devices and home computers that allow users to interact through the use of words, images, sounds, and video. Social media includes popular sites such as Instagram, TikTok, Twitter, and Facebook as well as sites that can aid in business networking, such as LinkedIn. The use and importance of social media in communications and public relations has grown drastically over the years and is now a staple in advertisements to mass audiences. For many newer companies and businesses geared towards young people, social media is a tool for advertising purposes and for growing brands. Social media provides additional ways to connect and reach out to a specific, targeted audience.

Social media has completely changed the way people communicate. Over the past twenty years, social media has drastically changed with TikTok and Instagram joining Facebook and Twitter as some of the leading social media platforms. With more platforms targeting younger generations, audiences are growing. TikTok alone announced that it has over 1 billion active global users and receives over 18 million views; this number has been growing every year.

Social media has introduced new difficulties into relationships. One way this has occurred is through catfishing. The term catfish refers to a person who uses a false online profile on a social media platform. Most commonly, a catfish communicates with another online profile to get them to fall in love with the false persona they created. The MTV reality show Catfish: The TV Show has brought mainstream attention to this issue. The goal of these episodes is to keep track of people who have fallen in love with someone they interacted with online but who have never met in person. As catfishing has become a mainstream term, people have begun to wonder how and why it continues to happen. Nev Schulman, host of the show, has said, "I think people will always be looking to fall in love. People will always hope for things to get better. For better or worse, there will always be people who may or may not look to take advantage of that."

=== Audio media ===
==== Recorded music ====
Recordings, developed in the 1870s, became the first non-print form of mass communication. The invention of the phonograph by Thomas Edison in the late 19th century, the graphophone by Alexander Graham Bell and Charles Tainter, and the gramophone by The Victor Talking Machine Company were the first competing mass media forms that brought recorded music to the masses. Recording changed once again in the 1950s with the invention of the LP (long play) vinyl record, followed by eight-track tapes, then vinyl, and finally cassettes in 1965. Compact discs (CDs) followed and were seen as the biggest invention in recorded arts since Thomas Edison. Nowadays, recorded music is usually listened to using streaming platforms such as Apple Music, YouTube Music, SoundCloud, and Spotify, which are becoming the primary sources of music recordings. Even with the progression into digital music, vinyl and cassettes remain popular physical forms of music.

==== Radio ====
Radio is considered the most widely accessible form of mass communication in the world and the medium used to the greatest degree in the United States. Internet radio has now become increasingly more popular as radio stations are streaming content through their websites and other applications. Music streaming services such as Apple Music and Spotify have also integrated radio features into their platforms. Spotify Radio is a feature that allows Spotify to continuously create a playlist for its users with tracks and podcast segments based on any artist or playlist they wish.

Podcasts

A podcast is an audio file that is recorded and digitally uploaded to an online platform in order to be downloaded and listened to by the general public. Podcasting, as a form of mass communication, has steadily risen in popularity over the past few years. From 2014 to 2019, podcasts have doubled in listeners and podcasting itself has grown by 122%. Following trends in radio and recorded music, podcasts are available to stream on numerous online platforms such as Spotify, YouTube, and Apple Music. Some podcasts are recorded in front of a live audience and then uploaded, enabling the public to listen to their favorite podcast hosts live. With the introduction of podcasts in the 2000s, people can now share niche interests, news, and conversations to a larger audience than was possible using traditional radio.

=== Convergence ===
Convergence refers to the coming together of telecommunications as forms of mass communication in a digital media environment. There is no clear definition of convergence and its effects; however, it can be viewed through three lenses: technological convergence, cultural convergence, and economic convergence. Technological convergence is the action of two or more media companies merging in a digital platform and can lead to companies developing new commodities or becoming part of new sectors and/or economies. Cultural convergence deals with the blending of different beliefs, values, and traditions between groups of people and may occur through the globalization of content. Sex and the City, an American television show set in New York City, was viewed internationally and became popular among female workers in Thailand. A study conducted on the consumption of YouTube by the Information Technology Department and Sociology Department at Cornell University concluded that cultural convergence occurs more frequently in advanced cosmopolitan areas.

=== Integrated communication ===
Integrated communication refers to the process of bringing together several types of mass communication to function across the mediascape. Integrated communication unifies all mass communication elements, such as social media, public relations, and advertising. This ensures that the ways in which a company communicates follow the company's business goals and remain consistent across all media channels. This brings value to brand loyalty and to maintaining brand identity.

=== Film and television ===
==== Film ====
The film industry began with the invention of the kinetoscope by Thomas Edison. His failure to patent it resulted in two brothers, Louis and Auguste Lumière, creating a portable camera that could process film and project images. The first public kinetoscope demonstration took place in 1893. By 1894, the Kinetoscope had become a commercial success, with public parlours established around the world. The invention quickly gained notoriety when the Lumiere brothers debuted a series of 60-second clips screened outdoors to a Parisian audience. Despite the ever-growing popularity of moving images, the Lumière brothers did not seek to revolutionize the style of the film but instead stuck to documenting daily life in France. This set the grounds for future film revolutionaries, including Georges Méliès, who sought to create narrative sequences in his films through the use of special effects. The first 30 years of cinema were characterized by the growth and consolidation of an industrial base, the establishment of the narrative form, and refinement of the technology.

==== Television ====
In the 1970s, television began to change to include more complicated and three-dimensional characters and plots. PBS launched in 1970, becoming the home for programming that would not be suitable for network television. It operates primarily on donations, with little government funding, rather than having commercials. On January 12, 1971, the sitcom All in the Family premiered on CBS, covering the issues of the time and portraying a bigot named Archie Bunker. By 1972, the sales of color television sets surpassed that of black-and-white sets. In the 1980s, television became geared towards what has become known as the MTV Generation, with a surge in the number of cable channels. Of all the mass media today, television attracts the largest number of viewers. Its audience is greater in size than that of any other media audience. Since television is able to attract the audiences of all age groups, literate and illiterate and of all strata of society, it has attracted an enormous audience.

=== Photography ===
Photography plays a role in the field of technology and mass communication by demonstrating facts or reinforcing ideas. Although photos can be altered digitally, it is still considered as proof to expose and communicate. Photography establishes the basic roles: recording great historic events, documenting sociological and journalistic research, and dynamically influencing the mobilization of public opinion toward social and legislative reforms.

==== History of photography ====
Camera obscura was one of the first techniques that led to creating photos. It could create an image on a wall or piece of paper. Joseph Niépce was the French inventor who took the first photo in 1827; the photo required 8 hours of exposure. In 1839, Louis Daguerre introduced the daguerreotype, which reduced exposure time to about thirty minutes. Over time, photography techniques progressed, including the advancement of image quality, the ability to add color to an image, and reductions in exposure time.

==== Contemporary photography industry ====
The modern industry has dramatically changed with the development of digital photography as phones and digital cameras have made film-based cameras a niche product. Kodak discontinued making color film in 1999 and declared bankruptcy in 2012. Other companies, such as Fujifilm, have adapted, despite a downturn in sales.

=== Interactive media ===
==== Video games ====
Video game genres are classifications assigned to video games based on their gameplay rather than visual or storytelling differences. A video game genre is defined by a set of gameplay challenges; genres are classified independently of when and where the game takes place. Video games have amassed a huge audience, with the industry grossing over 90 billion dollars in 2021. Not only are videos games a channel for mass communication but also the online platforms used in part with the game. Streamers can now go online and broadcast their games on Twitch and YouTube, allowing players to reach over 140 million users.

=== eBooks ===
eBooks have changed how people read. People are able to download books onto their devices, allowing consumers to track what they read, to annotate, and to search for definitions of words on the internet. Through the use of eBooks in education, the increased demand for mobile access to course materials and eBooks for students corresponds with the increased number of smartphones. E-readers, such as the Amazon Kindle, have advanced over the years — since its launch in 2007, the Kindle has expanded its memory from 4 GB to 8 GB. In addition, the Kindle has added accessories including games, movies, and music.

== Majority theories ==
Communication researchers have identified several major theories associated with the study of mass communication. Communication theory addresses the processes and mechanisms that enable communication.

- Cultivation theory, developed by George Gerbner and Marshall McLuhan, discusses the long-term effects of watching television and hypothesizes that the more television an individual consumes, the more likely that person is to believe that the real world is similar to what they have seen on television. Cultivation is closely related to the idea of the mean world syndrome, which asserts that people who watch the news frequently are more likely to believe the world is a "mean" place.
- Contingency theory informs organizations of how to communicate ethically with their publics, especially during times of crisis.
- Agenda setting theory centers around the idea that media outlets tell the public "not what to think, but what to think about." Agenda setting hypothesizes that the media has the power to influence public discourse and to tell people what important issues are facing society. This still remains important to digital mass communication because traditional news organizations can influence which topics recive public attention by choosing what stories they want to cover. On social media, the recommendation algorithms also influence which topics user will interact with. This creates more questions about how media organizations, digital platforms, and audiences influence the publics attention.
- The spiral of silence, developed by Elisabeth Noelle-Neumann, hypothesizes that people are more likely to reveal their opinion in public if they believe that they are of the majority opinion for fear that revealing an unpopular opinion would subject them to being a social outcast. This theory is relevant to mass communication because it hypothesizes that mass media has the power to shape people's opinions as well as relay opinions that are believed to be the majority opinion.
- Media ecology hypothesizes that individuals are shaped by their interactions with media and that communication and media profoundly affect how individuals view and interact with their environment.
- Semiotics considers language to be a system that has many different individual parts, which are called signs (words, images, gestures, and situations). The system of language changes over time, but semiotics analyses a system at a certain place in time.

== Issues and complications ==
Contemporary studies have developed to complicate and critique the societal impact of mass communication. Theorists such as Neil Postman and George Gerbner as well as authors such as Nicholas Carr have argued that the overindulgent and over-reliant have become consumed by mass communication and the mediums it utilizes. This reliance, they continue, produces notable complications and issues that have seeped into an increasingly technical and connected society.

=== Attention span ===
As the multitude of mass communication outlets increases daily, the availability of very niche and broad outlets has also increased. This availability and the countless opinions being accessed can lead to a skimming activity where authors such as Nicholas Carr have noticed that they have a shorter attention span and are more prone to only skimming an outlet rather than being attentive. This habit is very common as the multitude of sources permit us to only take things at face value. Mass communication began as a term covering radio, print, and television, but it was coined before the creation of the Internet, or the “Universal Medium.” The Internet has taken all the risks and complications of the three aforementioned mediums and has incorporated and built further upon them. The ability to have infinite sources of information has created a Peek-A-Boo World effect in which the constant flow and availability of information causes certain events become very popular but quickly fizzle out.

=== Mean world syndrome ===
This method of perception was coined by communications scholar George Gerbner and is associated with the impact of mass communication on one's thoughts of the world they live in. It was characterized to explain how people who are constantly subjected to the evils of the world, now made readily available through mass communication, have the belief that the world is only evil. Gerbner specifies that the context of violence within a story is also important; it is not the quantity that is the issue but rather how it adds up to tell said story. This conditioning can provoke a reaction of displeasure with the world as it can alter worldviews and it represents the power and darker side of mass communication. The ability to have any form of information reach anybody around the world in minutes through the Internet has only amplified this lens.

== Mass communications and health of public ==
Mass communication is necessary for improving awareness and education surrounding public health issues. Amidst the COVID-19 pandemic, mass communication has been crucial for educating the general public regarding precautionary measures needed to combat the spread of illness. Mass communication methods surrounding the establishment of effective public health programs include news stories, paid media, and social and digital media.

Components for an effective communications campaign, as per the CDC's requirements, include specific individualized training, guidance, and technical assistance. Included in those is the development of a plan for communication, analysis and awareness of key audiences, the development and preliminary testing of messages and materials, the selection of communication channels: print, broadcast, or digital, and communication categories: earned, paid, or social or digital media. This further includes providing training for the spokesperson and conducting audience research.

== Methods of study ==
Communication researchers study communication through various methods that have been verified through repetitive, cumulative processes. Both quantitative and qualitative methods have been used in the study of mass communication. The main focus of mass communication research is to learn how the content of mass communication affects the attitudes, opinions, emotions, and ultimately behaviors of the people who receive the message. Several prominent methods of study are as follows:

- Studying cause and effect relationships in communication can only be done through an experiment. This quantitative method regularly involves exposing participants to various media content and recording their reactions. To show the cause, mass communication researchers must isolate the variable they are studying, show that it occurs before the observed effect, and prove that it is the only variable that could cause the observed effect.
- Surveying, another quantitative method, involves asking individuals to respond to a set of questions to generalize their responses to a larger population.
- Content analysis (sometimes known as textual analysis) refers to the process of identifying the categorical properties of a piece of communication, such as a newspaper article, book, television program, film, or broadcast news script. This process allows researchers to see what the content of communication looks like.
- Ethnography, a qualitative methodology, allows a researcher to immerse themselves into a culture to observe and record the qualities of communication that exist there.

== Professional organizations ==
The Association for Education in Journalism and Mass Communication is the major membership organization for academics in the field, offering regional and national conferences and refereed publications. It is a non-profit, educational association for educators, students, and media professionals with annual conferences that specialize in education, research, and public services of various facets of journalism and mass communication. The American Society of Journalists and Authors is the largest organization of independent nonfiction authors and offers professional development services, which include benefits, conferences, workshops, and advocacy for the entirety of the freelance and publishing communities to develop adequate ethical standards within this field. The National Communication Association is another major professional organization, which aids scholars and researchers within the field by promoting free and ethical communication, and recognizing the study of all forms of communication through inquiry rooted in humanist, social science-based, and aesthetic means. Each of these organizations publishes a different refereed academic journal that reflects the research that is being performed in the field of mass communication and offers resources for researchers and academics within the field.

== See also ==
- Augmentative and alternative communication
- Communication rights
- Communication theory as a field
- Cross-cultural communication
- Intercultural communication
- Proactive communications
