= Whittell =

Whittell can refer to:

== People ==
- Crispin Whittell (born 1969), British director and playwright
- Giles Whittell (contemporary), English author and journalist
- H. T. Whittell (1826–1899), medical doctor in South Australia and Adelaide's City Coroner
- Hubert Whittell OBE (1883 – 1954), British army officer, Australian ornithologist
- Josephine Whittell (1883 – 1961), American character actress

== Other uses ==
- George Whittell High School, high school in Zephyr Cove, Nevada
  - George Whittell, American businessman, for whom the high school is named
