= Peter Hoskin =

British journalist

Peter Hoskin (born 1984) is a British journalist. He is the Games Critic for The Daily Mail, and at the end of October 2022 became books and culture editor of Prospect magazine.

== Biography ==
Peter Hoskin was born in Oxford in 1984 and grew up in Wales. After studying Politics, Philosophy and Economics at the University of Oxford, Hoskin became an economics researcher at the London-based public policy think-tank Reform. He then moved to The Spectator in 2008, where he served as Online Editor and ran their daily political blog Coffee House until June 2012.

Since leaving the staff of The Spectator, Hoskin has continued to write for the magazine on the arts. His work has also been featured in other publications, including The Times, The Daily Beast, The Tatler, the Daily and Sunday Telegraphs, The Times Literary Supplement, ConservativeHome and The Paris Review. In October 2020, he became the Games Critic of The Daily Mail, contributing a weekly reviews column.

Hoskin has written extensively about film, and lists his favourite directors as Jacques Tourneur, Josef von Sternberg and John Ford. He co-authored "The Spectator’s 50 Essential Films" alongside former Spectator editor Matthew d'Ancona.

In April 2018, Hoskin joined the Finch Publishing group as d'Ancona's Deputy Editor, with the pair eventually quitting in protest at the proposed sacking of two colleagues. Hoskin subsequently joined Tortoise Media, first as its Culture & Technology Editor, then as Executive Editor. His work there included overseeing the Slow Reviews series, in which various critics – such as Peter Paphides, Nikesh Shukla and Deborah Frances-White – wrote about ″the pop cultural artefacts that really brought about change″.
