= Leading Report =

American fake news website

- Founded: February 2023; 3 years ago
- Founders: Patrick Webb; Jacob Cabe
- Website: theleadingreport.com

Leading Report is an American fake news website and Twitter account that describes itself as a "leading source for breaking news". It is known for promoting misinformation and conspiracy theories, including about United States politics and COVID-19.

== History ==
The Leading Report Twitter account was created in May 2022. A corresponding website was later created in February 2023. The fact-checking website Science Feedback traced the website's ownership to two individuals named Jacob Cabe and Patrick Webb. Cabe is a former baseball athlete, while Webb is a car wash owner who is an admin of the Facebook group "Patriots for Trump" and has a history of promoting misinformation on social media.

== Misinformation and conspiracy theories ==
Leading Report has promoted misinformation about COVID-19 vaccines, (Note: Misinformation about COVID-19 vaccines:) climate change denial and false claims of electoral fraud in the U.S., including the "ballot mule" conspiracy theory. It has also promoted the false claim that hydroxychloroquine is effective against COVID-19. The misinformation tracker NewsGuard gave Leading Report a score of 0/100, stating that it "severely violates basic journalistic standards".

In October 2023, Leading Report tweeted that Hamas claimed Ukraine sold them weapons used in the October 7 attacks against Israel. Hamas had not made such a statement.

=== United States politics ===
In May 2023, Leading Report falsely claimed that Kevin McCarthy had called for the "immediate expulsion and possible prosecution of Rep. Adam Schiff for committing crimes of treason against the United States".

In June 2024, Webb promoted a conspiracy theory that CNN would implement a 1-2 minute delay for a presidential debate between Donald Trump and Joe Biden, "potentially allowing time to edit parts of the broadcast". The false claim was repeated by generative AI chatbots ChatGPT and Microsoft Copilot.

In September 2024, following Trump's widely criticised debate performance against Kamala Harris, Leading Report claimed that an ABC News whistleblower would "allegedly" release an affidavit proving that Harris had been given the debate questions ahead of time. The claim originated from an account named "Black Insurrectionist", which did not offer proof for its claim. The claim was amplified by Bill Ackman.

=== COVID-19 vaccines ===
In July 2023, Leading Report published an article claiming a "new comprehensive study" by Steve Kirsch, who is known for promoting misinformation about COVID-19 vaccines, found "that for Amish children, who are strictly 100 percent unvaccinated, typical chronic conditions barely exist, if any at all", including "auto-immune disease, heart disease, diabetes, asthma, ADHD, arthritis, cancer, and autism". The article cited anecdotal evidence Kirsch provided, and Kirsch had made no claim of a study finding zero cases of the conditions. A leader for the Amish Heritage Foundation stated they were aware of Amish children with each of these conditions, and that claims to the contrary are "anti-Amish tropes. It marginalizes us Amish people and contributes further harm toward Amish children who need medical care and attention".

In September 2023, Leading Report baselessly claimed that the COVID-19 vaccine would increase the risk of stillbirths. The false claim was amplified by Australian senator Matt Canavan.

== See also ==
- List of fake news websites
