= History of media studies =

Media studies encompasses the academic investigation of the mass media from perspectives such as sociology, psychology, history, semiotics, and critical discourse analysis. The purpose of media studies is to determine how media affect society.

Media studies in the United States is also known as Mass Communication, Communication Studies, Media Ecology.

== Chicago School ==
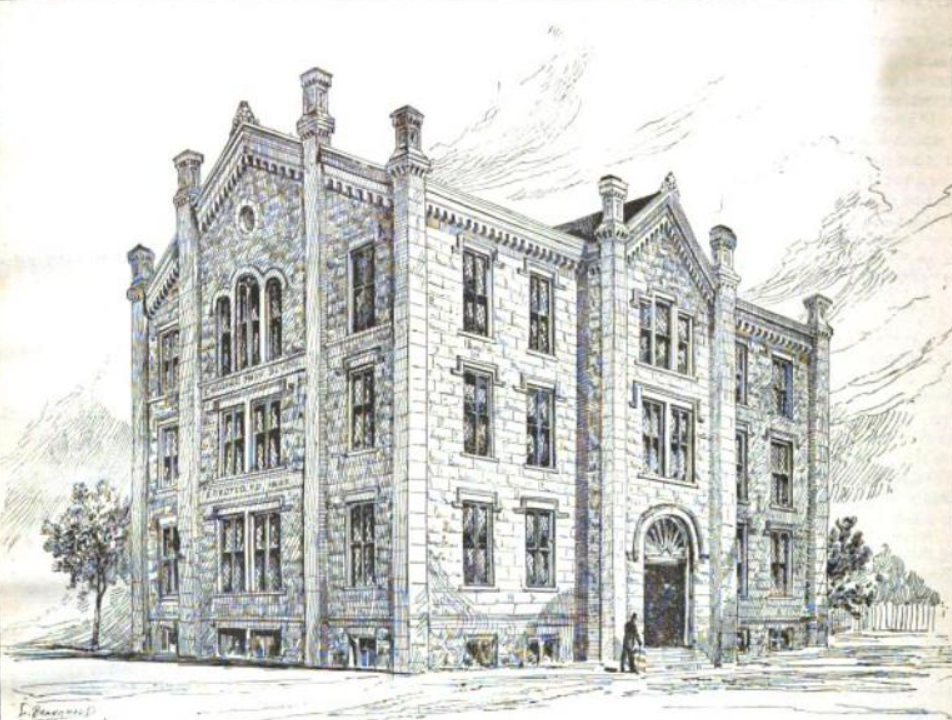

Though not yet named as such, media studies' roots are in the Chicago School and thinkers such as John Dewey, Charles Cooley and George Mead. These authors saw American society on the cusp of positive social change toward pure democracy. Mead argued that for an ideal society to exist, a form of communication must be developed to allow the unique individual to appreciate the attitudes, viewpoints and positions of others unlike himself, and allow him to be understood by others as well. Mead believed that this "new media" would allow humans to empathize with others, and therefore moves toward an "ideal of human society." Where Mead sees an ideal society, Dewey names it the "Great Community," and further asserts the assumption that humans are intelligent enough for self-government, and that that knowledge is "a function of association and communication." Similarly, Cooley asserts that political communication makes public opinion possible, which in turn promotes democracy. Each of these authors represent the Chicago School's attention to electronic communication as a facilitator of democracy, its faith in the informed electorate, and its focus on the individual as opposed to the mass.

== First M.A. Media Studies program in the U.S. ==
The social impact of mass communication has been studied at The New School University in New York since its founding in 1919. The first college course to investigate the motion picture was offered here in 1926. In the late 1960s it was that when it came to the knowledge of media, there was more information outside of classrooms compared to in it, due to film and TV. Marshall McLuhan's colleague, John Culkin who was one of the first educators of media education in schools, brought his Center for Understanding Media to The New School in 1975 and The New School began offering the Master of Arts degree in Media Studies, one of the first graduate programs of its kind. Today, among other programs, MA in Media Studies is still being offered by School of Media Studies, The New School, which will celebrate 40th anniversary of Media Studies at The New School during the academic year 2015–2016

== Propaganda studies ==
Between the First and Second World Wars, the Institute for Propaganda Analysis briefly rose to importance. Their definition of propaganda was

expression of opinion or action by individuals or groups deliberately designed to influence opinion or actions of other individuals or groups with reference to predetermined ends.

Harold Lasswell, who worked in the paradigm of the Chicago School of sociology wrote Propaganda Technique in the World War, which included this definition of propaganda:

Propaganda in the broadest sense is the technique of influencing human action by the manipulation of representations. These representations may take spoken, written, pictorial or musical form.

These definitions of propaganda clearly show that this was a school of thought that focused on media effects, as it highlighted the influence that media could have over its audiences attitudes and actions.

Epitomizing this early school of media effects studies are experiments done by The Experimental Section of the Research Branch of the U.S. War Department's Information and Education Division. In the experiments, the effects of various U.S. wartime propaganda films on soldiers were observed.

Current Propaganda studies are applied into many fields besides politics. Herman described a propaganda model as "a model of media behavior and performance, not of media effects." (Herman, 2000, p. 63) He argued: "They are profit-seeking business, owned by very wealthy people (or other companies); and they are funded largely by advertisers who are also profit-seeking entities, and who want their advertisements to appear in a supportive selling environment." He also presented "five factors: owner ship, advertising, sourcing, flak and anti-communist ideology-work as filters through which information must pass, and that individually and often in cumulative fashion they greatly influence media choices." Until now, there is no conclusion of propaganda, debate still continues.

== Frankfurt School Critical Theory ==
Typified by the philosophical and theoretical orientations of Max Horkheimer, Theodor Adorno, Walter Benjamin, Leo Lowenthal, and Herbert Marcuse, the Frankfurt school contributed greatly to the development and application of critical theory in media studies. Their Marxist critique of market-driven media was critical of its atomizing and leveling effects.

The Frankfurt school also lamented the effects of the "culture industry" on the production and appreciation of art. For example, in A Social Critique of Radio Music, Adorno asserts:

...music has ceased to be a human force and is consumed like other consumers' goods. This produces 'commodity listening'...The listener suspends all intellectual activity.

As the Frankfurt school lamented on the effects of the "culture industry" they also began to identify mass culture and high culture as two distinct entities. Scholars like Benjamin (1936) and Adorno (1945) can be credited with what would eventually become known as popular culture and high culture. Their finite distinction of equating original production with ritualistic behavior as compared with mass culture that finds its identifying symbols in reproductions. These reproductions are souless and lacking in definition and originality.

== Media effects ==
The less paradigm in media studies since the Second World War has been associated with the ideas, methods and findings of Paul F. Lazarsfeld and his school: media effect studies. Their studies focused on measurable, short-term behavioral 'effects' of media and concluded that the media played a limited role in influencing public opinion. The "Limited-Effects" Model developed by Lazarsfeld and his colleagues from Columbia was highly influential in the development of media studies. The model claims that mass media has "limited-effects" on voting patterns. Voters are influenced, rather, through the 'two-step flow' model, the idea that media messages are disseminated through personal interaction with 'opinion leaders'.

The model of limited- effects was so influential that the question of media "effects" on politics was left largely unaddressed until the late 1960s. Eventually Mass Communication scholars began to study political behavior again and the limited-effects model was called into question.

== Uses and gratification model ==
As a response to the previous emphasis upon media effects, from the 1970s researchers became interested in how audiences make sense of media texts. The "uses and gratifications" model, associated with Jay Blumler and Elihu Katz, reflected this growing interest in the 'active audience'. One such example of this type of research was conducted by Hodge and Tripp, and separately Palmer, about how school-children make sense of the Australian soap opera Prisoner. They found that pupils could identify with the prisoners: they were "shut in", separated from their friends and wouldn't be there had they not been made to be, etc. Also, the children could compare the wardens to their teachers: "the hard-bitten old [one], the soft new one, the one you could take advantage of..." John Fiske summarises:

The children inserted meanings of the program into their social experience of school in a way that informed both – the meanings of school and the meanings of Prisoner were each influenced by the other, and the fit between them validated the other.
