= Clare Melford =

English businessperson

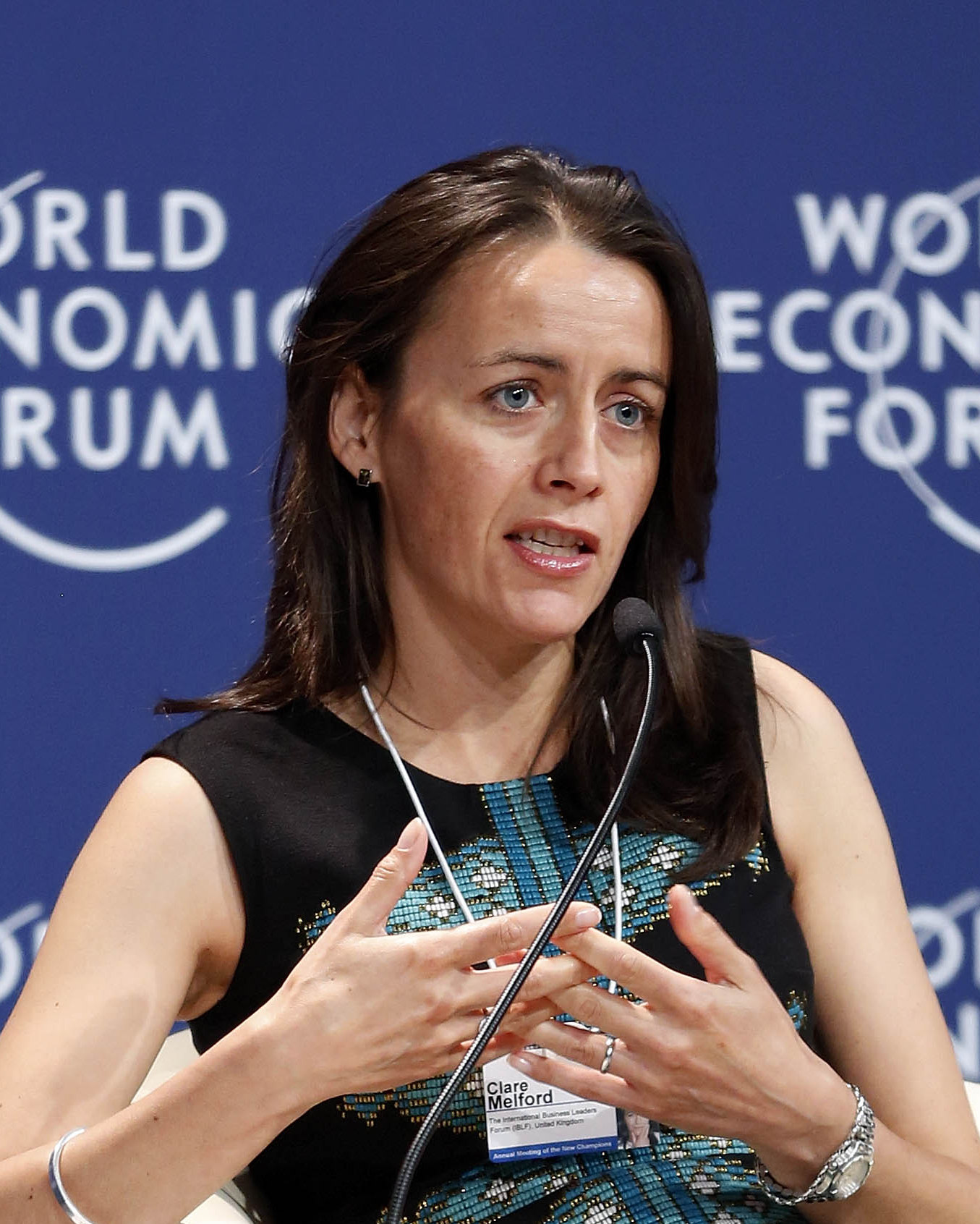
Clare Melford at the World Economic Forum Annual Meeting of the New Champions in 2012

Clare Melford was the CEO of the International Business Leaders Forum from November 2010 until she stepped down in November 2012. She was a co-founder of the Global Disinformation Index (GDI), a not-for-profit organisation which provides disinformation risk ratings. She has been targeted by US State Department. The UK government "support ... institutions which are working to keep the internet free from the most harmful content".

== Life ==
Melford graduated from Oxford University and trained as a management consultant at Marakon Associates. She worked as general manager for MTV Nordic for eight years. She took a leadership role in the transition of the European Council on Foreign Relations to independent status from previously being a part of George Soros' Open Society Foundations.

She was the co-founder of the Global Disinformation Index (GDI), a not-for-profit organisation which provides disinformation risk ratings. In 2020 the subject was listed as secretary with no financial compensation.

Melford explained to the Royal Society of Arts that it was while she was general manager of the Nordic region of MTV that she developed a critical understanding of how the media station provided a supportive selling environment for unsustainable lifestyles, which led to her giving up that position and becoming interested in Buddhism.

In December 2025, the US State Department imposed a visa sanction on Melford, as founder of GDI, for leading what US Secretary of State Marco Rubio called "organized efforts to coerce American platforms to censor, demonetize, and suppress American viewpoints they oppose". She and Imran Ahmed of the Center for Countering Digital Hate were identified for opposing internet sites that they claimed were spreading misinformation. The British government said "we support the laws and institutions which are working to keep the internet free from the most harmful content".
