= World News Daily Report =

Fake news website

- Website type: Satirical fake news
- Headquarters: Quebec, Canada
- Editors: Janick Murray-Hall, Olivier Legault,
- Website: worldnewsdailyreport.com
- Launched: November 2013

World News Daily Report (WNDR) was a satirical fake news website purporting to be an American Jewish Zionist newspaper based in Tel Aviv and dedicated to covering biblical archeology news and other mysteries around the globe.

It is run by Canadians Janick Murray-Hall and Olivier Legault and follows the old-school tabloid-style faux-journalism of its predecessors, such as the Weekly World News.

Snopes.com reports that the website perpetrates hoaxes and rumors to prey on credulous readers. The website combines religious and scientific fakery, political conspiracy theories, and "the occasional seed of truth" to create its false reports.

The Washington Post describes the World News Daily Report as a website that "delights in inventing items about foreigners, often Muslims, having sex with or killing animals".

The website carries this disclaimer: "WNDR assumes however all responsibility for the satirical nature of its articles and for the fictional nature of their content. All characters appearing in the articles in this website even those based on real people are entirely fictional and any resemblance between them and any persons, living, dead, or undead is purely a miracle."

== History ==
Since September 2013, Murray-Hall had been involved in creating a French-language site called Journal de Mourréal, intended to spoof the real Journal de Montréal. The Journal de Mourréal (a colloquial/slang name for the city) was ordered to stop using a similar logo as a trademark violation of the Journal de Montréal.

Interviewed about the Journal, Legault said that "our main goal is to have fun with this medium, but we still want to get a message through. It is a criticism of sensationalism in the media".

Murray-Hall and Legault founded World News Daily Report in November 2013. Most fake news sites started after Facebook made significant changes to their newsfeed in March 2013, allowing fake news to proliferate.

Radio Canada interviewed Olivier Legault about the Journal de Mourréal and World News Daily Report. They asked if he was concerned that people would believe the stories on the second site. Legault replied that the site was intended to encourage self-criticism, but also that it was people's fault if they wanted to believe fake stories. He continued, saying:

"The people who take it seriously are people who want to take it seriously. It's stupid to say, but… We preach to converts. The majority of people who share it understand that it's a joke, and others share it because they want to believe it, not because they really believe in it… You can invent everything and anything and people will believe it. Honestly, it's a little disturbing when you realise that. As long as you confirm what they want to believe, they will share it. If you go against their opinion, they will immediately think that this is false news. But if you go in the direction of their opinion, they will share it right away. They lose their critical spirit."

Legault claimed that since Google had reduced advertising revenue to Fake News sites at the beginning of 2017, the site had become less profitable. "The worst thing is that you're doing 100,000 or 200,000 page views a day, but you're not making money on it", Legault said. Radio Canada estimated using HypeStat that "WNDR would generate some 21,593 page views and $120.80 per day" in advertising revenue.

Murray-Hall also told Buzzfeed in 2017 that Google's move to reduce advertising revenue to fake news sites had reduced their revenues considerably: "Presently we aren't making any money at all, which is a real bummer so we don't know where WNDR is going to go from here. It's just a shame because WNDR is a monster, it can create major traffic like most sites could only dream of with only one post.”

== Reception ==
In 2015, listing WNDR ninth among "The 9 Worst Fake News Sites," Gizmodo said "the site doesn't always seem intent on deceiving people. But it's still not very good. Not very good at all." Later that year, The Independent included WNDR among sites that "play fast and loose with the word 'news' while delivering material that's completely fabricated."

In 2016, fact-checking website Snopes.com said WNDR "often take[s] advantage of politically, socially, or religiously divisive issues to drive outrage-based traffic". That same year, however, ABC News identified WNDR as "a satirical entertainment news site," and reproduced its online disclaimer reading, "WNDR assumes all responsibility for the satirical nature of its articles and for the fictional nature of their content. All characters appearing in the articles in this website—even those based on real people—are entirely fictional and any resemblance between them and any persons, living, dead, or undead is purely a miracle."

Also in 2016, the Columbia Journalism Review labeled WNDR as a fake news site despite having a legitimate-sounding name. At year-end, BuzzFeed recognized WNDR for scoring five times among the year's top 50 Biggest Fake News Hits On Facebook.

In 2017, fact-checking website PolitiFact deemed WNDR "a satirical news site," as did the Burlington County Times, while the Toronto Star cited WNDR as an example of "satirical sites posing as real news outlets."

Snopes regularly debunks WNDR articles, calling the site 'dubious', with 'a long record of entirely fabricated and sensationalist stories'. It also described its content as 'hate-baiting' and that its staff have a preoccupation with bestiality.

== See also ==
- List of fake news websites
- List of satirical news websites
