= Global Disinformation Index =

Not-for-profit advocacy organisation

- Disinformation Index Ltd
- Formation: 2018
- Type: Nonprofit
- Legal status: Company limited by guarantee (registered in England & Wales)
- Location: London, United Kingdom
- Key people: Clare Melford, Alexandra Mousavizadeh, Daniel Rogers
- Website: www.disinformationindex.org

Global Disinformation Index (GDI) is a not-for-profit organisation based in the United Kingdom, which aims to mitigate the spread of disinformation on the internet. The group utilises a system of ratings of news sources and websites to determine risk of disinformation. The group's efforts also include investigations into internet advertising, and the alleged use of disinformation in relation to COVID-19 featured on various websites. The group has faced criticism and scrutiny over allegations of political bias.

== Overview ==
GDI was founded in 2018 by Clare Melford and Daniel Rogers. Alexandra Mousavizadeh is listed as a primary contact for the organization by RAND. It has received funding through a combination of charitable trusts, governmental organizations, and tech licensees of its dynamic exclusion list. Contributors include the Knight Foundation, Foreign, Commonwealth and Development Office (FCDO), and Luminate Group.

One of its strategies promoted by GDI is the aim to remove financial incentives for news content that promotes "adversarial narratives". GDI's investigation of COVID-19 disinformation focused on the generation of illicit revenue for websites. GDI has reported that a 2022 evaluation of Italian online news sites resulted in categorising one third of the evaluated sites as high risk of disinformation.

== Reception ==
In February 2023, the Washington Examiner, a conservative website, alleged bias from the GDI, releasing an investigative series that characterised GDI as "part of a stealth operation blacklisting and trying to defund conservative media, likely costing the news companies large sums in advertising dollars". Gabe Kaminsky, the journalist who authored that series of stories, said that all 10 outlets that GDI in a report identified as the "riskiest" and "worst", all leaned to the political right while all but one of the 10 ranked "least risky" leaned to the political left. Kaminsky further said that GDI received $100,000 from the US Department of State; however, the State Department has denied that the grant was used to "blacklist" any companies in the US.

The series in the Washington Examiner sparked outcry among conservatives, and prompted a lawsuit by The Daily Wire and The Federalist, two American right-wing websites, against the State Department. The State Department-funded National Endowment for Democracy announced in 2023 that it would no longer fund GDI. After the series of stories, Microsoft's Xandr cut ties with GDI and exited the political advertising space. The US Congress passed a law in 2023 that banned the Pentagon from funding GDI in the future for military recruitment advertising.

In April 2024, UnHerd CEO Freddie Sayers criticized GDI after it placed UnHerd on its "dynamic exclusion list", leading to a reduction in UnHerd's advertising revenue. Sayers argued that GDI's determination was based on ideological disagreements rather than factual inaccuracies. In response, Elon Musk, the CEO of Twitter, called for GDI to be shut down. Following UnHerd's article, UK Business Secretary Kemi Badenoch joined around 10 MPs in raising concerns about GDI and their approach to distinguishing between free speech and disinformation. In response to Badenoch's concerns, Foreign Secretary David Cameron stated that FCDO had ceased funding GDI in 2023 and did not plan to resume funding. In December 2025, the State Department imposed a visa sanction on Melford, as founder of GDI, for leading what US Secretary of State Marco Rubio called "organized efforts to coerce American platforms to censor, demonetize, and suppress American viewpoints they oppose".

== Advisory panel ==
Until March 2023, GDI publicly disclosed members of its "Advisory Panel". Amongst others, these included Anne Applebaum, Peter Pomerantsev, Miguel Martinez, and Hany Farid. Reason reported in February 2023 that Applebaum had asked for her name to removed from the GDI website as she had not been in contact with GDI since 2019.

== See also ==
- Ad Fontes Media
- AllSides
- NewsGuard
