= Isaac Saul =

American journalist

- Born: Trenton, New Jersey, U.S.
- Education: Pennsbury High School
- Alma mater: University of Pittsburgh
- Occupation: Journalist
- Website: www.readtangle.com

Isaac M. Saul (/sɔːl/) is an American journalist. His work has appeared in publications including CNN, The Huffington Post, TIME Magazine, the Independent Journal Review and The Daily Mail. Outside of his work with newspapers, in 2020 he founded Tangle, an online newsletter which aims to give nonpartisan coverage of current events.

== Early life and education ==
Saul was born in Trenton, New Jersey. He first became interested in journalism during his time at Pennsbury High School in Pennsylvania, and got his first job in news while he was an undergraduate student in nonfiction writing at the University of Pittsburgh.

== Career ==
Saul later began work at The Huffington Post, which he left in 2014, and later worked for A Plus. During the course of his career as a reporter, Saul has covered issues mainly related to American politics and sports. His reporting on an encounter that he had with a controversial lawyer named Aaron Schlossberg was featured in a live broadcast on CNN in 2018. He has also worked as an opinion editor for several major magazines and published several editorials stating his opinions on specific political candidates. Other topics he has covered include religion.

Saul's work in reporting drew particular praise during the challenges to the 2020 US presidential election, when he helped to discredit some of the conspiracy theories and allegations of voter fraud around the election. As part of this effort, he published a running thread of tweets in which he challenged his readers to find an instance of alleged voter fraud that he could not disprove, a project which received external media coverage. Saul publicly condemned a number of the fraud claims that he had to respond to, saying that "new lies just kept pouring in", and expressed concern that some of the conspiracy theories were wrongly accusing poll workers of committing election fraud, which could put the lives of these workers in danger. In the end, he had challenged over 32 different conspiracy theories within the first week after the election results were announced.

Also in conjunction with the 2020 election, Saul drew coverage for betting $15,000 with a friend that Joe Biden would be inaugurated as president, a bet which he won.

In 2024, Saul gave a TED talk in Vancouver on the subject of bipartisan communication and the use of language to signal partisan identity in modern political discourse.

== Tangle ==
In July 2019 Saul began a politics newsletter called The Shuffle which was later renamed to Tangle. The newsletter continued to expand in readership over the coming months, eventually becoming read in as many as thirty countries. On April 19, 2021, Saul announced that he had quit his job as a newspaper editor to work on Tangle full-time. Tangle has received substantial media coverage focused on the success of its subscriber-based model and its efficacy in bridging political divisions. In 2023, the first live Tangle event, on the state of the Supreme Court, was hosted in Philadelphia. As of March 2025, Tangle is believed to have more than 325,000 subscribers in over 55 countries, generating over $2.25 million in revenue every year.

== Recognition ==
In 2016, Yahoo! News named Saul as one of the 16 people who had had the greatest influence on the 2016 US election. He also made the Forbes "Next 1000" list of "upstart entrepreneurs redefining the American dream". His media company Tangle won two Shorty Awards in 2024: Winner in the News & Media category and Audience Award in the same category. Additionally, Saul was featured in a 2024 episode of This American Life, which described how reading Tangle had saved the marriage of a politically divided couple.

== Personal life ==
Outside of his work, Saul is a former competitive ultimate frisbee player. He won multiple Pennsylvania state championships while playing for his Pennsbury High School team, he won two national championships with the University of Pittsburgh team, and he won a national championship with the Pride of New York (PoNY) club team in New York City. He has also played for the New York Rumble. Saul has traveled around the world for his work, and spent five months studying in a yeshiva while living in Jerusalem after college.

In January 2025, Isaac and his wife Phoebe had their first child; a baby boy named Omri.
