= Ground News =

Canadian news aggregation service

- Screenshot Screenshot of the international edition of the website on September 18, 2025
- Headquarters: Ontario, Canada
- CEO: Harleen Kaur
- Key people: Sukh Singh (CTO)
- Parent: Snapwise Inc
- Website: ground.news
- Launched: April 27, 2018; 8 years ago

Ground News is a Canadian news aggregation service founded by siblings Harleen Kaur and Sukh Singh in 2018. It functions as a news aggregator, presenting AI generated summaries of articles alongside information from third party bias trackers.

== Background ==
Ground News was co-founded on April 27, 2018, by Canadian siblings Sukh Singh and Harleen Kaur. Kaur was formerly an engineer at NASA, following which she was recruited by Rolls-Royce, eventually becoming vice president of their jet engine customer business division. Singh studied Nanotechnology Engineering at the University of Waterloo, receiving a BASc in 2012. He then worked in sales at Procter & Gamble, in research and development for Danaher, and later spent three years as a management consultant at Bain & Company. Ground News was started out of the University of Waterloo's Velocity incubator. Kaur and Singh are Chief Executive Officer and Chief Technology Officer respectively. The company's website states that it is staffed by 18 "media outsiders" and is headquartered in Ontario.

Ground News is the consumer-facing brand/product operated by Snapwise Inc, whose board includes Manuel Mattke, an employee of Joe Ricketts.

== Content ==
The stated goal of the service is to counteract media bias by displaying news events with sources from across the political spectrum. When a story is selected on Ground News, the user will see several outlets that have reported on the story labeled by their political leaning. Ground News follows a freemium model, which allows users to view news as a guest, with a free account, or with a paid account.

=== Ratings ===
The service marks every news source with a bias rating using terms borrowed from the left–right political spectrum. According to Ground News, sources on the far-left and far-right "use loaded words, publish misleading reports or leave out information" and are associated with the "most extreme [left-leaning or right-leaning] party members." While the bias ratings can be accessed with a free account, Ground News also provides factuality ratings behind a paywall. Both these ratings are averaged out from the ratings of three companies: AllSides, Media Bias/Fact Check, and Ad Fontes Media, who each have their own methods for determining factuality and bias. For example, in April 2024, Ground News used this method to rate CNN as "left-leaning", the Associated Press as "center", and Fox News as "right-leaning".

=== Blindspot ===
Ground News creates a weekly "blindspot" report, highlighting stories that received little to no coverage from one side of the political spectrum. Ground News uses natural language processing algorithms to identify related news stories, including ones that use differing vocabulary.

== Marketing ==
Promotion of Ground News heavily relies on social media marketing through sponsorship of YouTubers. Martina di Licosa of the Columbia Journalism Review said that these promoters span the political spectrum from left-wing commentator Adam Conover to far-right figures. In 2025, Axios reported a statistic from Gospel Stats indicating that Ground News was the most common sponsor on YouTube, with 1,863 integrations in a sample of 65,759 sponsored videos. The statistic also found that Ground News accumulated the highest total view count among sponsors in the sample, with 664 million views.

== Reception ==
A 2024 study by political scientist Curtis Bram reviewed the blindspot report's capability to reduce political polarization, concluding that "addressing 'Blindspots' through this non-confrontational, information-sharing approach may be a promising method to mitigate polarization." The Columbia Journalism Review criticized Ground News' automated system of aggregation and its paywalls on factuality ratings. In 2022, College & Research Libraries News reviewed the service to be "useful to anyone wanting to examine ideological bias in the news or evaluate the factuality of a source. However, some might find the free features limiting and get quickly frustrated by features that are locked behind a paywall." Ground News has also received criticism from literary blogger Eric Rosenfield for using false equivalency in their ratings methodology.
