= Tangle News =

American political newsletter

Tangle News (commonly referred to as Tangle) is an independent, nonpartisan political newsletter founded in 2019 by journalist Isaac Saul. Designed to provide balanced coverage of current events, Tangle aims to bridge political divides by presenting multiple perspectives on key issues. The newsletter follows a subscription-based model and has grown significantly, reaching over 275,000 subscribers in more than 55 countries as of 2024. It has been recognized for its role in fostering bipartisan discourse and combating misinformation, particularly during the 2020 U.S. presidential election.

Initially launched as The Shuffle, the newsletter was later rebranded as Tangle and gained a dedicated readership for its transparent editorial approach and focus on political neutrality. In 2021, Saul left his role as a newspaper editor to work on Tangle full-time. The publication has since expanded its influence, hosting live events, featuring interviews with policymakers, and across various digital platforms.

Tangle has received significant media attention for its innovative approach to news consumption. In 2024, it won two Shorty Awards in the News & Media category and was featured in This American Life for its impact on politically divided audiences.

As of January 2026, the media watchdog Ad Fontes Media rates Tangle in their Middle category of bias and as Reliable, Analysis/Fact Reporting in terms of reliability.
