= Tortoise Media =

British news website

- Tortoise Media's wordmark

- Website type: News website
- Available in: English
- Founded: 2018
- Founders: James Harding, Matthew Barzun, Katie Vanneck-Smith
- Editor: James Harding
- Website: www.tortoisemedia.com

Tortoise Media is a British news website co-founded in 2018 by James Harding, a former Director of BBC News and a former editor of The Times, and Matthew Barzun, a former U.S. Ambassador to the United Kingdom. Tortoise produces podcasts and holds live discussion events called "ThinkIns" and "Discussion Lates" in the London area. It is part of the slow journalism movement. It purchased The Observer in December 2024 with the transfer taking place on 22 April 2025.

== History ==
Tortoise Media was announced on Kickstarter in 2018, where it raised more than £500,000. Permanent invitations to ThinkIns and Discussion Lates were part of higher-tier Kickstarter reward packages. It also received private investment. Its website went live in April 2019.

Writing for The Guardian in 2018, Emily Bell said that Tortoise drew from ideas tried by The Guardian, Axios, Vox and Quartz. She said there was a trend of increased involvement of private wealth in the journalism industry, comparing Tortoise and its wealthy, well-connected founders and backers to Marc Benioff's purchase of Time and Jeff Bezos's purchase of The Washington Post. She also said that Tortoise's financial strength allowed it to attract high-profile journalists. The company received the Innovation of the Year award from the British Journalism Awards in 2019.

In September 2024 it was reported that Tortoise had approached the Guardian Media Group—proprietor of The Guardian and The Observer—with an offer to purchase The Observer for an undisclosed price. Guardian and Observer journalists voted to strike on 4 and 5 December 2024 in protest over a sale that they said would betray the commitment of the Scott Trust—owner of the Guardian Media Group—to the Observer.

As the strike was taking place, the Scott Trust agreed to go through with the sale, which occurred later that month.

== Funding and ownership ==
Funding was provided for three years by philanthropic foundations. Many shareholders are billionaires and family offices.

== Personnel ==
=== Business ===
- Emily Benn, former chief of staff
- Alexandra Mousavizadeh, former partner
- Ceri Thomas, editor and partner
- Saul Klein, investor, son of venture capitalist Robin Klein

=== Journalists ===
- Giles Whittell, deputy editor
- Matthew d'Ancona, former editor
- Peter Hoskin, former editor
- Paul Caruana Galizia, journalist, son of assassinated journalist Daphne Caruana Galizia
- Merope Mills, former reporter

=== Contributors ===
- Grace Hughes-Hallett
- Nichi Hodgson
- Samantha Weinberg
