= Bridge of Spies (book) =

- Author: Giles Whittell
- Language: English
- Subject: Cold War
- Genre: History
- Published: 2010
- Publisher: Broadway Books
- Publication place: United States
- Media type: Print
- Pages: 274 pp. (first edition)
- ISBN: 978-0-7679-3107-6
- OCLC: 505417133

Bridge of Spies: A True Story of the Cold War is a 2010 nonfiction book by Giles Whittell. The book documents prisoner exchanges between the United States and the Soviet Union of their spies during the Cold War. The book was first published by Broadway Books. An audiobook version was subsequently published by ISIS Publishing, being read by Jonathan Keeble.

== Reception ==
Andrew Stuttaford, reviewing the book in The Wall Street Journal, said while Whittell was not comparable to Tom Wolfe, Bridge of Spies was like Wolfe's The Right Stuff "with a peculiarly lethal twist". Stuttaford said, "The true stars of Mr. Whittell's narrative are an extraordinary airplane and the men who flew it," though he felt that the author drew "somewhat heavy-handed parallels" in the lead-up to the Iraq War in writing about the Cold War period's contrasting intelligence and politics.

Robert Legvold, reviewing for Foreign Policy, said, "Whittell is a master storyteller, and the story here—of three men seized during the Cold War—is better than Hollywood's best." Legvold said Whittell recounted the story's "utterly fascinating elements... in meticulous detail". The reviewer said, "The stakes in both instances may not have been as dramatic as he claims, but the events were emblematic of the Cold War's more shadowy and adventurous aspects."

Michael S. Goodman, writing in History Extra, said Bridge of Spies was comparable to the works of Ben Macintyre and found that while it was "not a new story", it had enough unique detail to make it novel. Goodman said, "The book is well researched, enthusiastically and dramatically written, and a joy to read."

The Guardian's Sue Arnold reviewed the audiobook, "Whittell's account of the real-life characters involved in the first cold war spy swap is as gripping and entertaining as any thriller." Arnold said, "Cold war politics are a Machiavellian minefield, but Whittell manages to untangle and elucidate it without losing any of the drama of the narrative."

== Related film ==
While the book shares the same name as the 2015 film that stars Tom Hanks, the film is not based on Whittell's book. The film is actually based in part on the book Strangers on a Bridge by James B. Donovan, a lawyer involved with the prisoner exchanges and played by Hanks in the film. Both the Whittell book and the film are based on the same events, though the book focuses on three prisoners that are part of the exchange process, where the film focuses on Donovan himself.
