= Media Bias/Fact Check =

American website

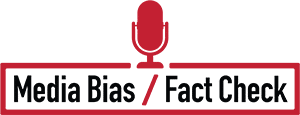
- Founded: 2015; 11 years ago
- Headquarters: Greensboro, North Carolina
- Owner: Dave M. Van Zandt
- Website: mediabiasfactcheck.com
- Current status: Active

Media Bias/Fact Check (MBFC) is an American media watchdog website founded in 2015 by Dave M. Van Zandt. It considers four main categories and multiple subcategories in assessing the "political bias" and "factual reporting" of media outlets, relying on a self-described "combination of objective measures and subjective analysis". It is widely used but has been criticized for its methodology. Scientific studies, using its ratings, found that ratings from Media Bias/Fact Check show high agreement with an independent fact checking dataset from 2017, NewsGuard, and BuzzFeed journalists.

== Methodology ==
Four main categories are used by MBFC to assess political bias and factuality of a source. These are (1) use of wording and headlines, (2) fact-checking and sourcing, (3) choice of stories, and (4) political affiliation. MBFC additionally considers subcategories such as bias by omission, bias by source selection, and loaded use of language. A source's "Factual Reporting" is rated on a seven-point scale from "Very high" down to "Very low".

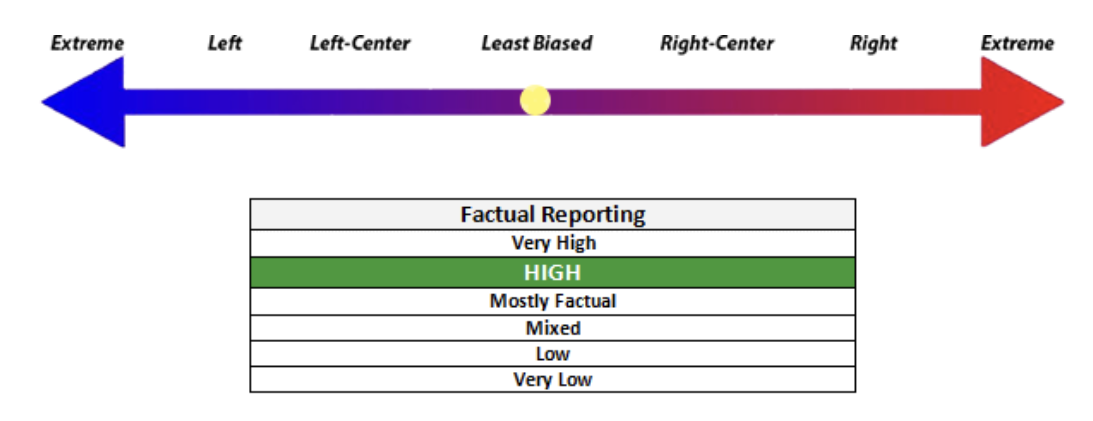
Chart showing the degree of bias and factual ratings given to Consumer Reports

Political bias ratings are U.S.-centric, and are "extreme-left", "left", "left-center", "least biased", "right-center", "right", and "extreme-right". The category "Pro-science" is used to indicate "evidence based" or "legitimate science". MBFC also associates sources with warning categories such as "Conspiracy/Pseudoscience", "Questionable Sources", and "Satire".

Fact checks are carried out by independent reviewers who are associated with the International Fact-Checking Network (IFCN) and follow the International Fact-Checking Network Fact-checkers' Code of Principles, which was developed by the Poynter Institute. A source may be credited with high "Factual Reporting" and still show "Political bias" in its presentation of those facts, for example through its use of emotional language. Only failed fact checks and "confirmed cases of misinformation" that have occurred within the past five years can be counted against a source. According to the methodology, an evaluation requires "a minimum of 10 headlines and 5 full news stories from each source" to be reviewed.

== Reception ==
MBFC has been used in studies of mainstream media, social media, and disinformation, among them single- and cross-platform studies of services including TikTok, 4chan, Reddit, Lemmy, Twitter, Facebook, Instagram, and Google Web Search. When MBFC factualness ratings of "mostly factual" or higher were compared to an independent fact checking dataset's "verified" and "suspicious" news sources, the two datasets showed "almost perfect" inter-rater reliability. A 2022 study that evaluated sharing of URLs on Twitter and Facebook in March and April 2020 and 2019, to compare the prevalence of misinformation, reported that scores from Media Bias/Fact Check correlate strongly with those from NewsGuard (r = 0.81).

A comparison of five fact checking datasets frequently used as "groundtruth lists" suggested that choosing one groundtruth list over another has little impact on the evaluation of online content. In some cases, MBFC has been selected because it categorizes sources using a larger range of labels than other rating services. MBFC offers the largest dataset covering biased and low factual news sources. Over a 4-year span, the percentage of links that could be categorized with MBFC was found to be very consistent. Research also suggests that the bias and factualness of a news source are unlikely to change over time. The site has been used by researchers at the University of Michigan to create a tool called the "Iffy Quotient", which draws data from MBFC and NewsWhip to track the prevalence of "fake news" and questionable sources on social media.

A 2018 year-in-review and prospective on fact-checking from the Poynter Institute, which develops PolitiFact, cited a proliferation of credibility score projects, including MBFC, writing, "While these projects are, in theory, a good addition to the efforts combating misinformation, they have the potential to misfire", and stating that "Media Bias/Fact Check is a widely cited source for news stories and even studies about misinformation, despite the fact that its method is in no way scientific." Also in 2018, a writer in the Columbia Journalism Review described MBFC as "an armchair media analysis", and characterized their assessments as "subjective assessments [that] leave room for human biases, or even simple inconsistencies, to creep in". A 2020 study published in Scientific Reports wrote: "While [Media Bias/Fact Check's] credibility is sometimes questioned, it has been regarded as accurate enough to be used as ground-truth for e.g. media bias classifiers, fake news studies, and automatic fact-checking systems."

== See also ==
- Ad Fontes Media
- AllSides
- Ground News
