= Our.News =

Fact-checking platform

- Website type: Factchecking
- Founded: 2016
- Owner: Richard Zack
- Founders: Richard Zack, Neta Iser
- Services: Crowdsourced Factchecking, Nutrition Labels for News, Newstrition
- Website: https://our.news/
- Commercial: Yes
- Registration: Optional
- Launched: 2017
- Current status: Inactive

Our.News was a fact-checking platform that provided "nutritional labels" combining automated and user-assigned scores to rate the reliability of news articles. Since July 20, 2023, the website is inactive. The platform was available both as a browser extension for Google Chrome and Firefox, and a mobile app for iOS. The Labels were aimed to combat online misinformation, providing a condensed breakdown of the background ingredients and information that make up any news article. This included info about the publisher, author, editor, third-party fact checks, article sources, AI article classifications, and public opinion ratings.

The company's "Nutrition Labels for News" products were also branded as Newstrition. Richard Zack was the founder and CEO of the company. Neta Iser was a co-founder and Chief Data Scientist, and Jared McKiernan was editor.
