= Ad Fontes Media =

American media watchdog organization

Ad Fontes Media, Inc.
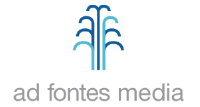
- Founded: 2018; 8 years ago
- Founder: Vanessa Otero
- Products: Media Bias Chart
- Website: www.adfontesmedia.com

Ad Fontes Media, Inc. is a Colorado-based media watchdog and for-profit public benefit corporation, primarily known for its nonpartisan Media Bias Chart. The organization was founded in 2018 by patent attorney Vanessa Otero with the goal of combating political polarization and media bias. Ad Fontes Media uses a panel of analysts across the political spectrum to evaluate articles for the Chart. The chart markets its analysis to advertisers looking for third-party rankings of news sources in assessing brand safety, and it is generally considered a simple guide but not a solely authoritative source for understanding media biases. The Media Bias Chart rates media sources on two scales: political bias on the horizontal axis and reliability on the vertical axis.

== History ==
Ad Fontes Media has its origins in a blog called All Generalizations are False which was written by patent attorney Vanessa Otero from Denver, Colorado. Otero first published the Media Bias Chart, a graphic that helped viewers visualize media bias in the United States, on the blog. The Media Bias Chart became a viral phenomenon on the Imgur image sharing service in December 2016, and Otero founded Ad Fontes Media to serve as the publisher of the chart. One of Otero's reasons for creating the organization was that "many sources people consider to be 'news sources' are actually dominated by analysis and opinion pieces", and that "extreme sources play on people's worst instincts, like fear and tribalism, and take advantage of people's confirmation biases." In an interview with Newsy, she stated, "If people understood that the sources they are consuming are actively making them angrier and polarizing them, then they might choose to consume less of that."

In 2018, Ad Fontes successfully launched a crowdfunding campaign to improve the technology behind the chart, increase the number of analysts, and make the site's methodology more transparent. Otero chose the name "Ad Fontes" because it is Latin for "to the source"; her method is to go to a media source itself and rate its bias and reliability "by analyzing the source and its actual content". Iterations of the chart have been released since December 2016. The chart generally positions right-wing and left-wing views as being equally extreme, putting "centrist" news sources at the center and top of the pyramid, with closer proximity to the top of the pyramid indicating the most "unbiased" or "bipartisan" sources. A 2021 analysis by research librarians criticised this approach as creating a false equivalency between the left and the right, describing the chart as ultimately "a meme, not an information literacy tool". Otero responded directly to this analysis and defended the methodology, recognizing limits but defending the tool against some specific criticisms.

In 2021, Otero appeared on PBS to discuss political bias. In 2023, she published an op-ed column in Poynter, titled "Why I decided to rate the news". The model continues to be updated, with Harvard Library's research guide noting its reach and growing influence in spring of 2024 as having studied 3,600 news sources, 700 podcasts, and 474 TV/video programs, citing the ongoing debate over its credibility and providing a basic summary of its methodology.

== Media Bias Chart ==
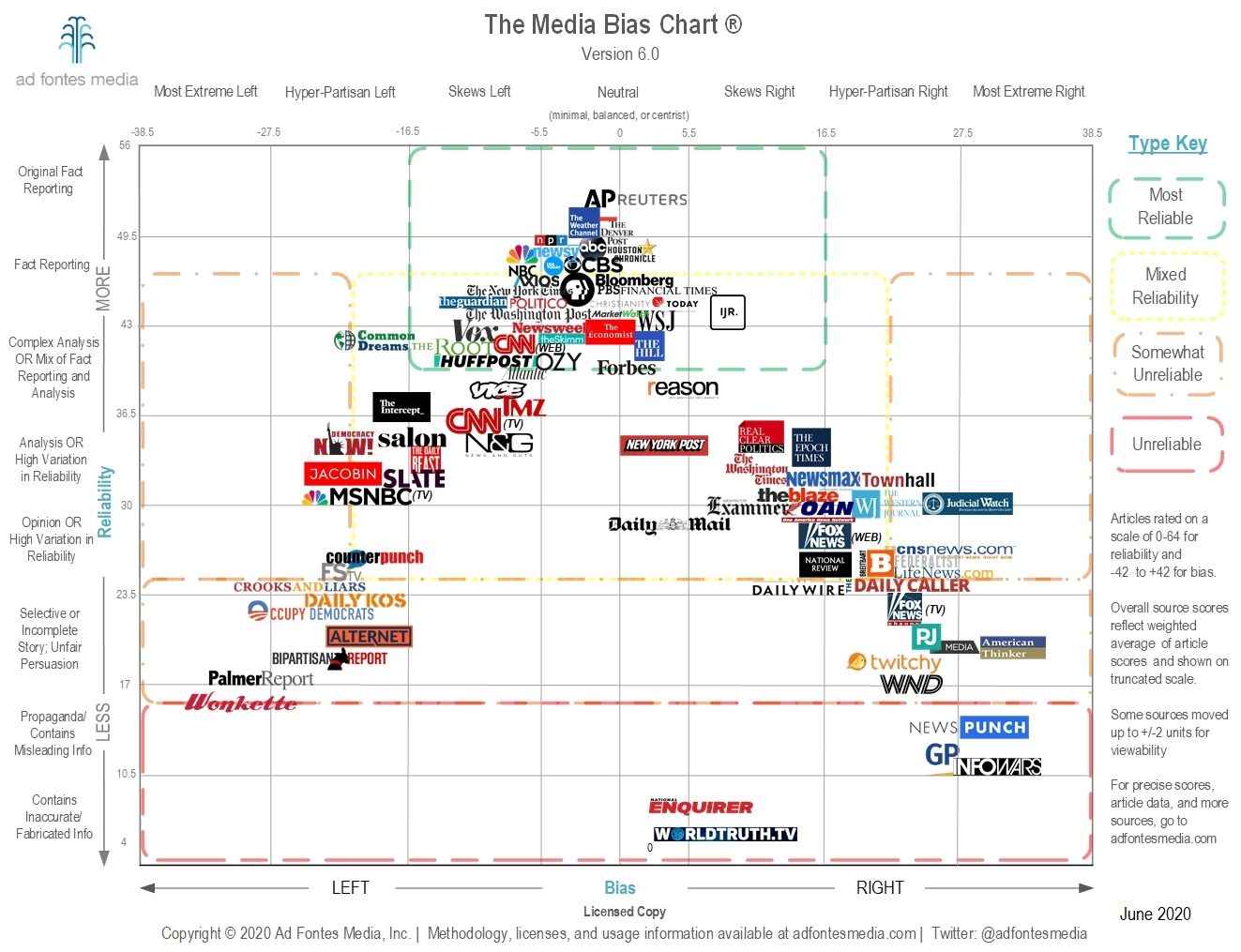
Ad Fontes Media Bias Chart

The Media Bias Chart by Ad Fontes Media rates various media sources on two different scales: political bias (left to right) on the horizontal axis and reliability on the vertical axis. On the chart, sources are concentrated in an "inverted-U" shape as media sources with a neutral bias are generally reliable in their original fact reporting, while sources with an extreme bias on either side often contain factually inaccurate information and propaganda.

Ad Fontes is nonpartisan. During the September 2020 media bias project, nearly 1,800 individual articles and TV news shows were rated by at least three analysts with different political views (left, right, and center). There were 120 analysts, each reviewed about 370 articles and about 17 TV shows. Each analyst rated approximately three articles from each of the over 100 news sources available for viewing on the Chart. As a result, there were nearly 7,000 individual ratings.

Otero sees the Media Bias Chart as an "anchor" that counteracts political polarization in news media, and aspires for Ad Fontes to become a "Consumer Reports for media ratings". She compared low-quality news sources to junk food, and described sources with extreme bias as "very toxic and damaging to the country".

=== Methodology ===
As of 2021, the methodology of the Media Bias Chart was described thusly:

The Ad Fontes methodology consists of multi-analyst ratings of news sources along seven categories of bias and eight of reliability. Each source is rated by an equal number of politically left-leaning, politically right-leaning, and politically centrist analysts, whose scores along each dimension are averaged (after any notable score discrepancies are discussed and scores adjusted if the outlier is convinced).

Each analyst completes a political identity assessment; all analysts hold at least a bachelor's degree—and most hold a graduate degree—with one-third holding or in the process of obtaining a doctoral degree.

Analysts are selected by a panel of application reviewers consulting a rubric of candidate qualifications—including education, political/civic engagement, familiarity with news sources and United States government systems, reading comprehension and analytical skills, among others.

Once hired, analysts complete a minimum of 20 training hours to learn the content analysis procedure before contributing ratings to the data set.

According to Natasha Strydhorst of the College of Media & Communication, Texas Tech University, the ratings system provides "a viable operationalization of audiences' media selections". At the same time, she wrote, "It does not (and cannot) measure objective media bias and reliability, but it also shares this limitation with other available measures of the phenomena."

== Reception ==
The chart has been criticized by people on the left and the right. According to Otero, "A lot of people on the left will call us neoliberal shills, and then a bunch of people that are on the right are like, 'Oh, you guys are a bunch of leftists yourselves.'" In 2018, a Columbia Journalism Review article questioned the thoroughness of the Media Bias Chart (when it was based solely on Otero's opinions) and similar initiatives, stating that "the five to 20 stories typically judged on these sites represent but a drop of mainstream news outlets' production."

In 2021, an article on the Association of College and Research Libraries' blog argued that the Media Bias Chart is detrimental to media literacy efforts because it "promotes a false equivalency between left and right, lionizes a political 'center' as being without bias, and reinforces harmful perceptions about what constitutes 'news' in our media ecosystem, and is ignored by anyone that doesn't already hold a comparable view of the media landscape."

News sources that were rated as "heavily biased" on the Media Bias Chart have been critical of the chart. Alex Jones, the founder of right-wing conspiracy theory site InfoWars, said in 2018 that Ad Fontes' chart represented the "dying dinosaur media's extreme liberal bias" after the chart classified InfoWars as "nonsense damaging to public discourse". InfoWars responded with a chart of their own, putting themselves as "independent" and representing "freedom" while labeling news sources like the Associated Press as "tyranny" and "state-run corporate/foreign influences"; InfoWars's chart was widely criticized by journalists on Twitter.

== FTC investigation ==
In June 2025, the U.S. Federal Trade Commission (FTC) issued civil investigative demand (CID) letters to several media rating firms, including Ad Fontes Media, requiring them to disclose details about their operations, finances, methodologies, and industry relationships. The investigation is part of broader government scrutiny into media rating firms and their role in evaluating news sources for misinformation, hate speech, and deceptive content. Ad Fontes Media CEO Vanessa Otero described the demands as "excessive" and "overzealous", stating that such requests are typically reserved for entities facing litigation. Despite concerns about the burden of compliance, Ad Fontes Media stated that it would cooperate with the FTC's inquiry.

== See also ==
- AllSides
- Cognitive bias mitigation
- Global Disinformation Index
- Ground News
- Journalism ethics and standards
- Media Bias/Fact Check
- NewsGuard
