= Giles Whittell =

English author and journalist

Giles Quintin Sykes Whittell (born in March 1966) is an English author and journalist who has worked for The Times as Correspondent in Russia and the United States.

Whittell was educated at Sherborne School and Christ's College, Cambridge (B.A. 1988). He has worked for The Times of London since 1993, first as US West Coast Correspondent from 1993 to 1999 and later as Moscow Correspondent (1999–2001) and Washington Bureau Chief (2009–2011). He is the paper's chief leader writer (editorial writer) before joining Tortoise Media (now The Observer) as Deputy Editor in 2018.

His books include Lambada Country (1992), Extreme Continental (1994), Spitfire Women of World War II (2007) and Bridge of Spies, a New York Times bestselling account of the 1962 spy swap of Rudolf Abel for Gary Powers and Frederic Pryor. The book was published in the US in 2010 and the United Kingdom in 2011.

His latest book, Snow: A Scientific and Cultural Exploration, was published by Atria Books in 2019.
