= Alexandra Mousavizadeh =

Danish economist

- Born: 18 September 1970 (age 56); Copenhagen, Denmark
- Education: University of Copenhagen
- Occupation: Economist
- Organization: Evident Insights Ltd
- Spouse: Nader Mousavizadeh (div. 2020)

Alexandra Mousavizadeh (born 18 September 1970) is a Danish economist and CEO of Evident. She is the co-creator of The Evident AI Banking Index, the Evident AI Insurance Index, the Responsibility100 Index and the Global AI Index.

She specializes in index creation, using data to build benchmarks that rank nations, companies and other entities on key economic and technological issues. Mousavizadeh is a recognized commentator on AI maturity, implementation, and strategy in financial services.

== Early life ==
Mousavizadeh was born in Copenhagen to a Danish father, Steen Vedel and an English mother, Susanna Foster Dickson Vedel. Her grandfather, Sir William Dickson was Marshal of the Royal Air Force and Chief of the Defence Staff and a Knight Commander of the British Empire; through him she is a direct descendant of Lord Nelson.

She was educated in Denmark, and Down House boarding school in Berkshire, England before to returning to Denmark to attend N. Zahle's School in Copenhagen. From 1989 to 1994 she attended the University of Copenhagen, graduating with an MA in Economics with a focus on Game Theory.

== Career ==
Mousavizadeh began her career at the Danish Ministry of Foreign Affairs, in the Department for Humanitarian and Development Funding before joining as a visiting Research Scholar at the Center for Strategic and International Studies in Washington, DC.

Mousavizadeh then worked for Moody's for 10 years in New York, covering emerging and frontier markets for the Sovereign Risk team. Following a spell with Morgan Stanley in London as head of country risk management for EMEA, she returned to Moody's as assistant vice president for the Africa sovereign ratings portfolio.

Mousavizadeh acted as director of the Legatum Prosperity Index. The ranking is based on a variety of factors including wealth, economic growth, education, health, personal well-being, and quality of life.

Before joining the Legatum Institute, Mousavizadeh was CEO of ARC Ratings, an Emerging Market-based ratings agency. ARC Ratings was established in 2013 by a consortium of five domestic credit rating agencies operating in Asia, Africa, Europe and South America, with substantial cumulative resources, including over 10,000 clients, more than 600 ratings staff and an average ratings business record of over 20 years.

=== Tortoise Media ===
Mousavizadeh was a partner at Tortoise Media, from 2018 until 2022 and director of the Tortoise Intelligence team. Tortoise Media is a journalistic platform, founded by James Harding, the Former Director of BBC News, Katie Vanneck-Smith, the former President of The Wall Street Journal and Matthew Barzun, Obama's former ambassador to the UK. She oversaw the development of the team's indices and data analytics projects.

At Tortoise Media, Mousavizadeh created the Global AI Index in December 2019. It was presented at the World Economic Forum in December 2020. The index draws on primary data to measure a nation's capacity for artificial intelligence – specifically through the processes of innovation, investment and implementation – amongst OECD countries. The Global AI Index has been featured in a number of publications, including WIRED, Politico, Irish Times, The South China Morning Post and Medium.

=== Evident ===
Mousavizadeh is currently the co-founder and CEO of Evident, an intelligence platform that benchmarks and tracks AI adoption across the financial services sector. In January 2023, the company launched its inaugural Evident AI Banking Index, the first public ranking of the largest financial services companies in the world on their maturity in developing and using artificial intelligence. The Evident AI Index evaluates 50 of the largest banks in North America, Europe, and Asia against 90 individual indicators drawn from millions of publicly available data points. The benchmark spans four critical pillars of AI capability: talent, innovation, leadership, and transparency. As of July 2025, there have been two subsequent versions of the Index published, with the third edition arriving in October 2025, as well as reports on AI talent, leadership and innovation, use-cases and return on investment.

In June 2025, Mousavizadeh and her team launched the Evident AI Insurance Index. The Index provides a benchmark of AI maturity across the insurance sector, evaluating 30 of the largest insurers in North America and Europe against 70+ individual indicators drawn from millions of publicly available data points.

== Commentary ==
Mousavizadeh has been appointed as a specialist judge for the World Data Visualization Prize, in partnership with the World Government Summit. Mousavizadeh's analysis has featured in a number of publications, including The Wall Street Journal, the Financial Times, The Moscow Times, Euromoney, and eNCA.
