= Supportive selling environment =

Setting that makes products look appealing to consumers

Supportive selling environment is an environment which allows for commodities to appear in attractive light. The term was used by Edward Herman and Noam Chomsky in their analysis of the propaganda model.

Clare Melford explained that it was while she was General Manager of the Nordic region of MTV that she developed a critical understanding of how the media station provided a supportive selling environment for unsustainable lifestyles, which led to her giving up that position.

It has been adopted as an element in the Certificate IV in Business Sales (BSB40607) in that candidates are expected to develop techniques to create a supportive selling environment in a face-to-face environment.
