= NewsGuard =

Browser plugin that rates the credibility of news and information websites

- Developers: NewsGuard Technologies, Inc.
- Release: March 2018; 8 years ago
- Stable release: Chrome, Edge, Firefox, Safari: 5.10.2 (Edge) / April 14, 2026; 7 months ago
- Platform: Browser extension
- Type: Browser extension
- License: Proprietary
- Website: www.newsguardtech.com

NewsGuard is a rating system for news and information websites. It is accessible via browser extensions and mobile apps. It rates the websites' trustworthiness on a scale of 0 to 100, based on whether they adhere to editorial and journalistic standards. NewsGuard Technologies Inc., the company behind the tool, also provides services such as misinformation tracking and brand safety for advertisers, search engines, social media platforms, cybersecurity firms, and government agencies.

== History ==
NewsGuard Technologies was founded in 2018 by Steven Brill and L. Gordon Crovitz, who serve as co-CEOs. Crovitz was a former publisher of The Wall Street Journal. In 2018, Joyce Purnick, former bureau chief and editor at The New York Times, and Amy Westfeldt, an editor with the Associated Press for 25 years, joined Newsguard. NewsGuard expanded its coverage to news in European languages such as French and German ahead of the 2019 European Parliament election.

In April 2019, the co-founders of NewsGuard announced that they had entered talks with British internet service providers to incorporate their credibility scoring system into consumer internet packages. Under the plans, a user would see a warning message before visiting a misleading site without needing to have the NewsGuard extension installed. Users would also have the ability to disable the feature.

In January 2020, NewsGuard began notifying users that it would become a paid, member-supported browser extension in early 2020, while remaining free for libraries and schools. Early adopters received a 33% discount on the price, paying $1.95/month (USD) or £1.95/month (UK). NewsGuard launched in Australia and New Zealand in March 2023. As of 2025, they offer reliability scores of news sources on web, social media, and mobile platforms.

== Company structure and business model ==
NewsGuard is based in New York City. It raised $6 million in 2018. Investors include the Knight Foundation, Publicis, and former Reuters executive Tom Glocer. Its advisors include former officials such as Tom Ridge (former Secretary of Homeland Security), Richard Stengel (former Under Secretary of State for Public Diplomacy and Public Affairs), Michael Hayden (former Director of the CIA), Anders Fogh Rasmussen (former Secretary General of NATO), and Wikipedia founder Jimmy Wales. For revenue, NewsGuard Technologies licenses their ratings. Clients include technology companies and the advertising industry, who view the ratings as a way to protect clients against advertising on sites that could harm their brand. In January 2022, the company said it was profitable, having doubled its revenue over the previous year.

== Products and services ==
As of 2019, the company employed 35 journalists to review over 2,000 news sites. Ratings are broken down in terms of reliability, trustworthiness, and financial conflict of interest. This and additional information is then displayed in the form of a "Nutrition Label" by the NewsGuard browser extension whenever a user visits a news site. Sites that pass are shown with a green icon next to their name. Those with low scores are shown with a red icon. Research has shown that readers who see the green icon find the corresponding news site more accurate and trustworthy compared to those who see no icon or a red icon. Brill positions the extension as an alternative to government regulation and automated algorithms, such as those used by Facebook. NewsGuard attempts to advise sites that it labels as unreliable on how to come into compliance with its rating criteria.

=== Supported systems ===
NewsGuard operates a consumer-facing browser extension, as well as mobile apps for iOS and Android. Supported browsers for the extension include Google Chrome, Microsoft Edge, Firefox, and Safari. It is free of charge for Microsoft Edge users.

=== Partnerships ===
NewsGuard contracts with the United States Department of Defense. Since 2022, NewsGuard has partnered with the American Federation of Teachers (AFT) so that many classrooms and libraries in the United States have the NewsGuard browser extension installed on their computers, expanding access to millions of users. In 2023, Reporters Without Borders partnered with NewsGuard to launch the Journalism Trust Initiative (JTI) in Ukraine, to help support trusted media in crisis zones. In March 2024, NewsGuard announced it would be launching services aimed at countering AI-generated election misinformation. It also announced partnerships with technology companies such as Microsoft, which has licensed NewsGuard's products to train its new version of its Bing search engine.

=== Disinformation research ===
==== Artificial intelligence ====
NewsGuard has audited the output of various AI models to identify disinformation. When The New York Times replicated their experiment in 2023, they found that ChatGPT offered disinformation in its responses 33% of the time. NewsGuard later found that DeepSeek's output was considerably more likely to produce disinformation, at an 83% failure rate. In August 2025, they found that leading generative AI tools repeat false news claims 35% of the time on average. NewsGuard also audited Sora 2 and found that it produced videos advancing fake claims in 80% of cases. According to NewsGuard, Russian propaganda networks are attempting to "infect" large language models by spamming fake news, so that they will output more pro-Russia disinformation.

==== Russian disinformation ====
NewsGuard has researched Russian disinformation multiple times. In April 2025, the group uncovered a disinformation campaign by Storm-1516 targeting France, consisting of AI generated videos and fake news stories which were designed to incite racism and discredit French and Ukrainian leaders. Following the 2025 Russia–United States summit, NewsGuard found that Russian groups were spreading false rumors of a Ukrainian assassin in Alaska and a potential cession of Alaska to Russia, and tracked the spread of the claims across social media. In September 2025, they found that Moldova was targeted by over 40 false narratives, with the goal of undermining President Maia Sandu and Moldova's potential EU accession ahead of parliamentary elections.

== Ratings ==
NewsGuard's team of journalists and editors rate websites based on the following criteria:

1. "Does not repeatedly publish false or egregiously misleading content."
2. "Gathers and presents information responsibly."
3. "Has effective practices for correcting errors."
4. "Handles the difference between news and opinion responsibly."
5. "Avoids deceptive headlines."
6. "Website discloses ownership and financing."
7. "Clearly labels advertising."
8. "Reveals who's in charge, including possible conflicts of interest."
9. "The site provides the names of content creators, along with either contact or biographical information."

They clarify that a site rating above 75% indicates credibility, a site rating of 60-75% indicates "credibility with exceptions", and a site rating below 60% indicates unreliability; the ratings are explained in depth in each site's "Nutrition Label". Their founders cautioned that the "Nutrition Labels" should not be treated as an endorsement equivalent to the nutrition facts label from the Food and Drug Administration. As of January 2021, NewsGuard said it has rated more than 6,000 news sites that account for 95% of online engagement with news in the U.S., the U.K., France, Germany and Italy. In 2022, a study from the NYU Center for Social Media and Politics found that, although NewsGuard ratings did not noticeably reduce the popularity of unreliable news sources, they encouraged the most frequent consumers of misinformation to read more reliable news sources.

=== Examples ===
As of March 2023, The Guardian Australia, ABC News Australia, and The Australian had scored 100/100 when NewsGuard launched in Australia. As of June 2024, the service rated Fox News at 69.5, Breitbart News at 49.5, The New Republic at 92.5, Mother Jones at 69.5, and The Washington Post at 100. In 2024, it downgraded The New York Times from 100 to 87.5 for not distinguishing clearly enough between opinion and fact. As of December 2024, NewsGuard rated Newsmax and One America News Network at 20. The company issues corrections for erroneous ratings. When MailOnline objected to being listed as unreliable, NewsGuard admitted they were wrong on some counts, and the decision to list MailOnline as unreliable was reversed in 2019.

== Criticism ==
In 2018, Joshua Benton wrote in the Columbia Journalism Review that NewsGuard is "trying to attack a real problem in misinformation; they’re doing interesting work that I enjoyed exploring. But the upside of this sort of labeling — a quick way to make a judgment at a glance — is in direct tension with the nuance modern media literacy requires." In March 2025, the U.S. District Court for the Southern District of New York dismissed a defamation lawsuit against NewsGuard by the Consortium for Independent Journalism (CIJ), the owner of the website Consortium News. The ruling was that the CIJ did not make a sufficient showing that NewsGuard acted with actual malice in assessing the credibility of its journalism.

=== Allegations of bias and censorship ===
NewsGuard's partnership with the AFT was criticized by American conservatives and Republican Party politicians who said that NewsGuard ranked left-leaning media outlets higher than right-leaning ones, citing a study by the Media Research Center in 2021. (Note: In 2019 NewsGuard approved sites include The New York Times, The Wall Street Journal, and BuzzFeed. Sites labeled as unreliable include Breitbart News, InfoWars, the Daily Kos, Sputnik, RT, WikiLeaks, Fox News, The Epoch Times, and Leading Report.) In 2024, Republican House Oversight Committee chairman James Comer opened a probe into NewsGuard, accusing them of having an anti-conservative bias and demanding more details on their collaboration with government agencies. In response, CEO L. Gordon Crovitz said, "Under NewsGuard's apolitical rating system, many conservative outlets outscore similar left-leaning brands: The Daily Caller outscores The Daily Beast, the Daily Wire outscores the Daily Kos, Fox News outscores MSNBC and The Wall Street Journal outscores the New York Times."

In 2024, The Daily Wire, The Federalist, and Texas attorney general Ken Paxton sued the Department of State, arguing that providing a $25,000 grant to NewsGuard was funding technology that censored right-leaning news outlets. The Biden administration sought to have the case dismissed but federal judge Jeremy Kernodle agreed with the plaintiff and allowed the case to proceed. The second Trump Administration later abolished the Global Engagement Center, effectively ending the State Department's support for NewsGuard.

Brendan Carr, who became Donald Trump's appointee to the Federal Communications Commission, accused NewsGuard of censorship and sent a letter to some tech companies to discourage them from working with NewsGuard. Some legal experts said that NewsGuard's opinions on sites' credibility are protected by the First Amendment of the Constitution, and that the way Carr pressured private companies against working with NewsGuard raises First Amendment concerns. NewsGuard also replied that there were actually more conservative outlets it rated as credible than liberal ones. The Washington Post described NewsGuard's rating criteria as nonpartisan, writing that while fighting disinformation was still bipartisan when NewsGuard launched in 2018, disinformation watchdogs have since become a target of the Republican Party.

== See also ==
- Ad Fontes Media
- AllSides
- Global Disinformation Index
- Media Bias/Fact Check
- Michael Hayden
