= Steve Harmon (actor) =

American stage and television actor

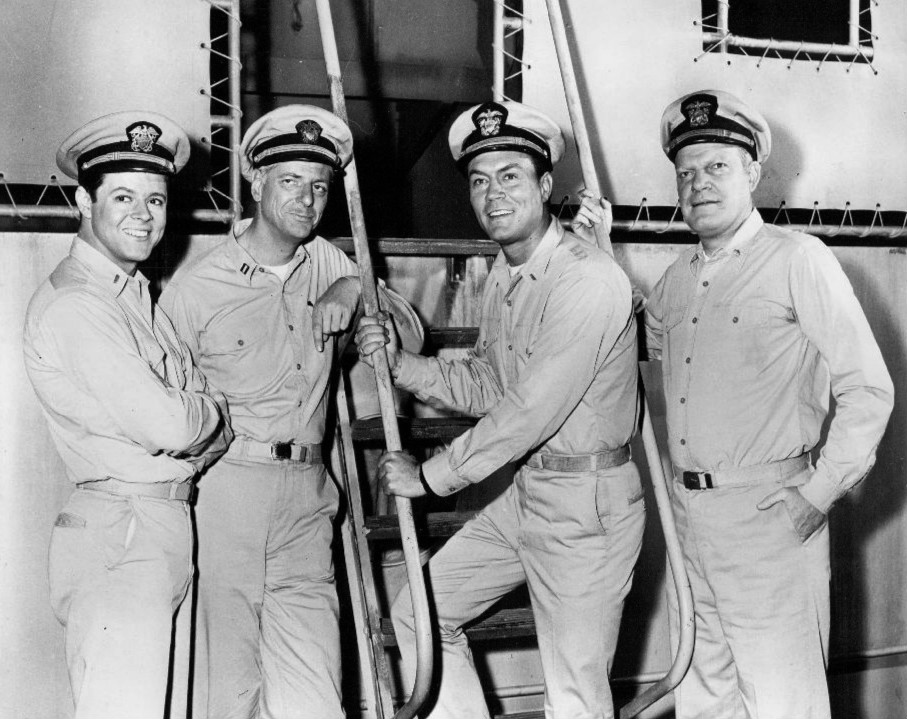
- Harmon (left) with George Ives, Roger Smith and Richard X. Slattery in Mister Roberts, 1967
- Born: December 30, 1940; Brooklyn, New York, U.S.
- Died: July 7, 2008 (aged 67); Kailua, Hawaii, U.S.
- Occupations: Stage and television actor

Steve Harmon (December 30, 1940 – July 7, 2008) was an American stage and television actor. He was best known for playing Ensign Frank Pulver in the American sitcom television series Mister Roberts.

== Life and career ==
Harmon was born in Brooklyn, New York. At an early age, he began dancing. He acted on stage as a child, and danced in the 1950s on the television programs The Ed Sullivan Show, The Bell Telephone Hour and The Perry Como Show. He began his screen career in 1964, appearing in the ABC sitcom television series Wendy and Me.

In 1965, Harmon starred as Ensign Frank Pulver in the NBC sitcom television series Mister Roberts, starring along with Roger Smith, George Ives, Richard X. Slattery, Ray Reese and Richard Sinatra. After the series in ended in 1966, he guest-starred in television programs including That Girl, The Girl from U.N.C.L.E. and Occasional Wife. In 1968, he appeared in his first and only film The One and Only, Genuine, Original Family Band.

Harmon retired from acting in 1970, last appearing in the NBC soap opera television series Another World, playing the recurring role of Chris Tyler. After retiring from acting, he worked in real estate in Los Angeles, California.

== Death ==
Harmon died on July 7, 2008, in Kailua, Hawaii, at the age of 67.
