= The FBI Story =

1959 film

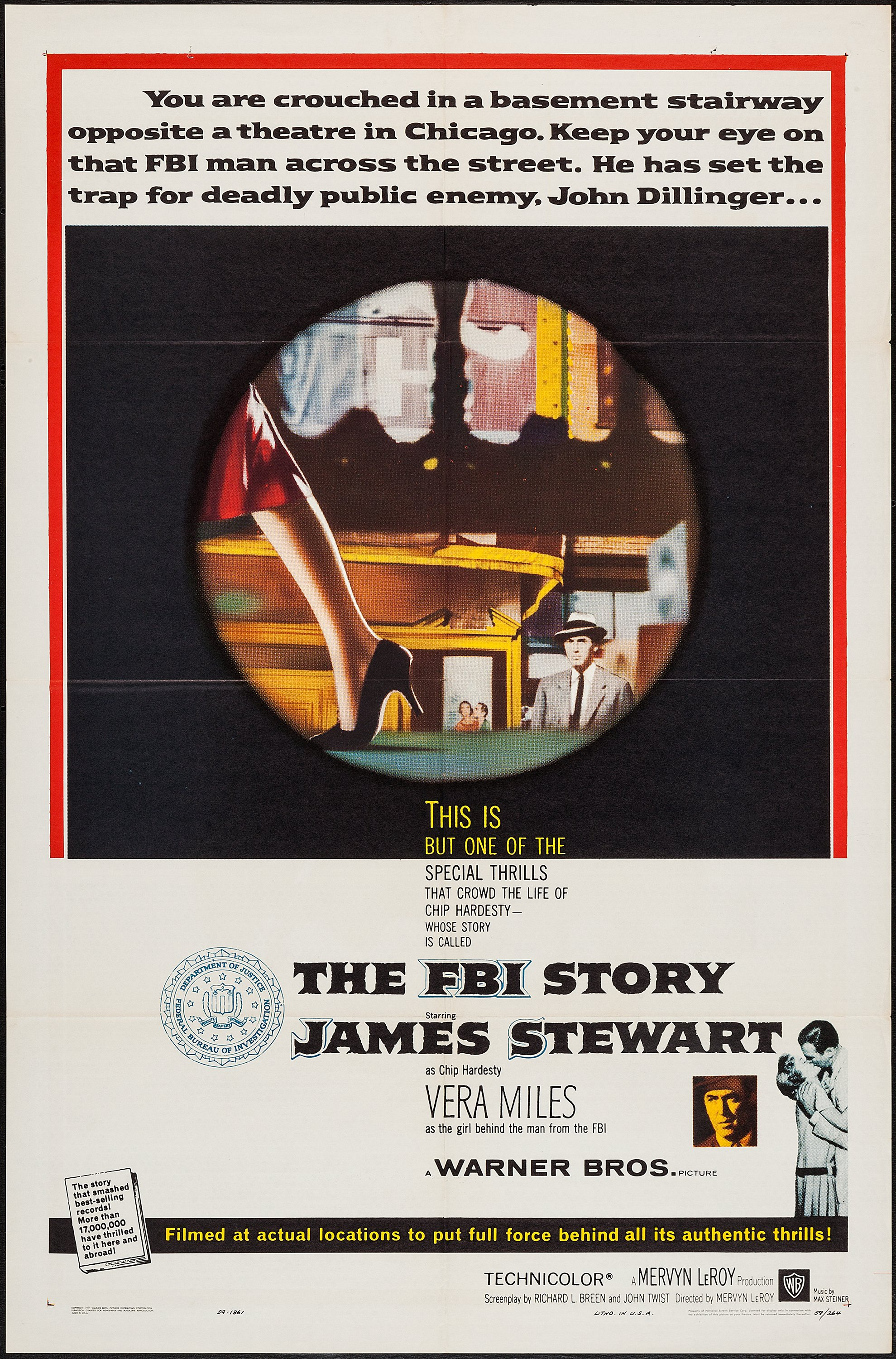
- 1959 theatrical poster
- Directed by: Mervyn LeRoy
- Screenplay by: Richard L. Breen; John Twist
- Based on: The FBI Story: A Report to the People; 1956 book by Don Whitehead
- Produced by: Mervyn LeRoy
- Starring: James Stewart; Vera Miles
- Narrated by: James Stewart
- Cinematography: Joseph F. Biroc
- Edited by: Philip W. Anderson
- Music by: Max Steiner
- Production company: Mervyn LeRoy Productions
- Distributed by: Warner Bros. Pictures
- Release date: September 24, 1959
- Running time: 149 minutes
- Country: United States
- Language: English
- Box office: $3.5 million (est. US/ Canada rentals)

The FBI Story is a 1959 American crime drama film starring James Stewart, and produced and directed by Mervyn LeRoy. The screenplay by Richard L. Breen and John Twist is based on a book by Don Whitehead.

== Plot ==
John Michael ("Chip") Hardesty is delivering a lecture to the Federal Bureau of Investigation (FBI). He begins to recount his history as an agent of the bureau, which is shown as a series of flashbacks.

The first details a plane crash due to a time bomb in a suitcase. As the plane parts are being reassembled and examined, FBI agents interview dozens of people, leading to John Gilbert "Jack" Graham, the son of one of the passengers. After feigning innocence, Graham finally confesses.

In May 1924, Hardesty was working as a government clerk for the nascent FBI in Knoxville, Tennessee. He proposes to his sweetheart, librarian Lucy Ann Ballard. She thinks that Hardesty's potential is being wasted by the FBI and wants him to start practicing law. They marry with this idea in mind. Hardesty is inspired to stay with the bureau after hearing a speech from its new director, J. Edgar Hoover. Lucy Ann reveals that she is pregnant; she persuades Hardesty to stay in the bureau for another year.

Hardesty is sent to the South to investigate the Ku Klux Klan. He is moved around until he is sent to Ute City, Wade County, Oklahoma, (Note: The real case was in Osage County, the Osage Indian murders, between 1921 and 1923.) to investigate murders of Native Americans who had oil-rich mineral land and rights. The FBI was compelled to investigate after one murder was committed on federal government land. The FBI forensics laboratory ties the doctored wills and life insurance policies of the murder victims to banker Dwight McCutcheon (Note: In real life a rancher, William King Hale) with the typewriter that he used. Lucy Ann, already the mother of three, suffers a miscarriage around this time.

On June 17, 1933, three FBI agents were escorting Frank "Jelly" Nash from a train to a car outside the Union Station in Kansas City when they were ambushed and killed. This event changed the FBI; a year later, Congress gave the FBI statutory authority to carry guns and make arrests.

After receiving a tip, Hardesty and his friend, Sam Crandall, head to Spider Lake, Wisconsin, on April 22, 1934, but barking dogs alert the gangsters and they scatter. The agents head to a nearby country store to call the Chicago office. When they get there, they find Baby Face Nelson holding two men hostage. Nelson opens fire, fatally wounding Crandall.

Hardesty recounts his involvement in the capture and deaths of numerous mobsters of the day, including John Dillinger, Pretty Boy Floyd, Baby Face Nelson and Machine Gun Kelly. Kelly coined the term, "G-Men", during his arrest, when he shouted, "Don't shoot G-Men, don't shoot!". Because she fears for his life and cannot persuade Chip to leave the bureau, Lucy decides to spend some time apart, and takes the children for an extended stay with her parents. While preparing an Easter egg hunt, Lucy calls her mother "a real nag". Lucy's mother sarcastically says that Lucy's father is also "a nag". Realizing that she has been nagging Hardesty to leave his job, and that the family is miserable without him, Lucy and the children return home.

With the U.S. entry into World War II, "enemy aliens" (Americans of Japanese, German and Italian descent) are rounded up by the FBI and sent to internment camps, to prevent possible espionage and collaboration with Axis powers. The ranks of the bureau are doubled from about 2,500 to more than 5,000 agents. One of those aspiring new agents is the deceased Sam's son, George, who is worried that he will never live up to his father's reputation; a romance buds between him and Hardesty's oldest daughter. Hardesty's only son announces his enlistment in the U.S. Marine Corps.

During the war, Hardesty is sent to South America to relieve three agents whose identities have been compromised. (Note: The CIA did not yet exist at the time, and U.S. wartime covert activities in Latin America were directed by the FBI's Special Intelligence Service.) The third one is George; he has been deep in the jungle intercepting secret radio messages. Local authorities move in, forcing the FBI agents to destroy the equipment and flee. Hardesty and Lucy's son is eventually killed in the Battle of Iwo Jima.

Later, a New York City clothes cleaner finds a hollow half-dollar with microfilm inside. The FBI investigates and tracks the owner of the clothing, a communist spy, leading to his capture as well as that of an associate.

Hardesty concludes his speech to the FBI. He is greeted by his family outside the building. He now has a grandson. The family drives away.

== Cast ==
- James Stewart as John Michael "Chip" Hardesty
- Vera Miles as Lucy Ann Hardesty
- Murray Hamilton as Sam Crandall
- Larry Pennell as George Crandall
- Nick Adams as John Gilbert "Jack" Graham
- Diane Jergens as Jennie Hardesty
- Jean Willes as Anna Sage
- Joyce Taylor as Anne Hardesty
- Victor Millan as Mario
- Parley Baer as Harry Dakins
- Fay Roope as Dwight McCutcheon
- Ed Prentiss as U.S. Marshal
- Robert Gist as Medicine Salesman
- Buzz Martin as Mike Hardesty (USMC)
- Kenneth Mayer as Casket Salesman
- Paul Genge as Suspect
- Kimberly Beck as Jennie Hardesty, age 2
- Eleanor Audley as Mrs. King

== Production ==
The Federal Bureau of Investigation had great influence over the production, with J. Edgar Hoover acting as a co-producer of sorts. Hoover had LeRoy re-shoot several scenes he didn't think portrayed the FBI in an appropriate light, and played a pivotal role in the casting for the film. Hoover and LeRoy were personal friends. Hoover had to approve every frame of the film and also had two special agents with LeRoy for the duration of filming. Hoover himself appears briefly in the film.

== Historical accuracy ==
Baby Face Nelson was hiding out with John Dillinger, but it was at the Little Bohemia Lodge, just outside Manitowish Waters, Wisconsin. Nelson was holding two hostages in a house and, when the car came up, Nelson, wanting to take the vehicle, rushed forward shouting for the occupants to get out, but then opened fire on the car shooting all three lawmen.

In the case of the New York City clothes cleaner, it was, in actuality, a nickel, not a half-dollar, and took four years to unfold, not the short matter of days in the film. On June 22, 1953, a newspaper boy, collecting for the Brooklyn Eagle, was paid with a nickel that did not sound or feel right to him. It was not until a Soviet KGB agent, Reino Häyhänen, wanted to defect in May, 1957, that the FBI would be able to link the nickel to KGB agents, including Vilyam Genrikhovich Fisher (aka Rudolph Ivanovich Abel) in the Hollow Nickel Case. The deciphered message in the nickel turned out to be worthless, a personal message to Häyhänen from the KGB in Moscow welcoming him to the U.S. and instructing him on getting set up).

== Comic book adaptation ==
- Dell Four Color #1069 (November 1959)

== See also ==
- List of American films of 1959
- Killers of the Flower Moon (film)
