= The One and Only, Genuine, Original Family Band =

1968 film by Michael O'Herlihy

- Theatrical release poster
- Directed by: Michael O'Herlihy
- Screenplay by: Lowell S. Hawley
- Story by: Lowell S. Hawley; Michael O'Herlihy
- Based on: The Family Band: from the Missouri to the Black Hills, 1881-1900 by Laura Bower Van Nuys
- Produced by: Bill Anderson
- Starring: Walter Brennan; Buddy Ebsen; Lesley Ann Warren; John Davidson; Janet Blair
- Cinematography: Frank V. Phillips
- Edited by: Cotton Warburton
- Music by: Songs: Richard M. Sherman; Robert B. Sherman; Score: Jack Elliott
- Production company: Walt Disney Productions
- Distributed by: Buena Vista Distribution
- Release date: March 21, 1968 (Radio City Music Hall)
- Running time: 110 minutes
- Country: United States
- Language: English
- Box office: $2,250,000 (US/ Canada)

The One and Only, Genuine, Original Family Band is a 1968 American comedy musical western film from Walt Disney Productions. Distributed by Buena Vista Distribution, the film is based on a biography by Laura Bower Van Nuys, directed by Michael O'Herlihy, with original music and lyrics by the Sherman Brothers.

Set against the backdrop of the 1888 presidential election, the film portrays the musically talented Bower family, American pioneers who settle in the Dakota Territory. The film stars Walter Brennan, Buddy Ebsen, Lesley Ann Warren, John Davidson, Janet Blair, Kurt Russell, and Goldie Hawn in her film debut.

== Plot ==
The Bower Family Band petitions the Democratic National Committee to sing a rally song for President Grover Cleveland at the party's 1888 convention.

On the urging of Joe Carder, a journalist and suitor to eldest Bower daughter Alice, the family decides instead to move to the Dakota Territory. There, Grandpa Bower, a staunch Democrat, causes trouble with his pro-Cleveland sentiments. The Dakota residents are overwhelmingly Republican, and they hope to get the territory admitted as two states (North and South Dakota) rather than one (so as to send four Republican senators to Washington rather than two).

Grandpa's actions result in family strife, including nearly costing Alice her position as the town's new schoolteacher. The budding romance between Joe and Alice also suffers.

In the end, more ballots are cast for Cleveland, but Republican nominee Benjamin Harrison nonetheless wins the Electoral College vote and the presidency. Before he leaves office, Cleveland grants statehood to both the two Dakotas, along with Montana and Washington, evening the gains for both parties.

The Dakotans, particularly the feuding young couple, resolve to live together in peace.

== Cast ==
- Walter Brennan - Renssaeler Bower
- Buddy Ebsen - Calvin Bower
- John Davidson - Joe Carder
- Lesley Ann Warren - Alice Bower
- Janet Blair - Katie Bower
- Kurt Russell - Sidney Bower
- Bobby Riha - Mayo Bower
- Jon Walmsley - Quinn Bower
- Smith Wordes - Nettie Bower
- Heidi Rook - Rose Bower
- Debbie Smith - Lulu Bower
- Pamelyn Ferdin - Laura Bower
- Steve Harmon - Ernie Stubbins
- Richard Deacon - Charlie Wrenn
- Wally Cox - Wampler
- John Craig - Frank
- Bill Woodson - Henry White
- Goldie Hawn (as Goldie Jeanne Hawn) - Giggly Girl
- Jonathan Kidd - Telegrapher
- Butch Patrick (uncredited) - Johnny de John

== Songs ==
=== "The One and Only, Genuine, Original Family Band" ===
The film opens with Grandpa conducting all ten members of the Bower family, each playing a different musical instrument. Practicing in their barn, the family dances among the animals and hay, boasting of their unique talents and versatility.

=== "The Happiest Girl Alive" ===
Alice expresses her intense emotions over receiving her latest letter from suitor Joe Carder.

=== "Let's Put It Over with Grover" ===
The Bowers perform this Grover Cleveland campaign song to a representative from the Democratic National Committee.

=== "Ten Feet off the Ground" ===
Ecstatic at the prospect of performing at the National Convention, the family band engages in an impromptu celebration. They sing about the feeling which only music can bestow, figuratively lifting them "Ten Feet off the Ground". This was one of two songs from the film covered by Louis Armstrong later in 1968.

=== "Dakota" ===
Joe Carder entices local Missouri families, singing about the marvels of the Dakota Territory. "Dakota" is similar in style to the title song of Oklahoma! and was once considered as a candidate for "state song" for South Dakota.

=== "'Bout Time" ===
Joe Carder expresses his devotion to Alice, telling her it's "'Bout Time" they were engaged, she responds in kind, and the two sing this duet. This song was covered by Louis Armstrong and was later featured in the film Bewitched (2005).

=== "Drummin' Drummin' Drummin'" ===
Grandpa Bower recounts the tale of a young drummer boy during the Civil War, inspiring all the children in the school house that they too can stand their ground and make a difference.

=== "West o' the Wide Missouri" ===
On election night, locals dance and celebrate their part in American expansionism west of the Missouri River.

=== "Oh, Benjamin Harrison" ===
The Republicans in town have their own campaign song, presented as something of a parody of "Let's Put It Over with Grover"; they sing their praise for Benjamin Harrison, who is "far beyond comparison".

== Soundtrack ==
The original cast soundtrack was released on Buena Vista Records in stereo (STER-5002) and mono (BV-5002).

Disneyland Records released a second cast album with studio singers and arrangements by Tutti Camarata, with both mono (DQ-1316) and stereo (STER-1316) versions.

Neither the soundtrack nor the second cast album have been released on CD or streaming services.

== Production ==
The feature was originally planned as a two-part television special based on the Laura Bower Van Nuys memoir The Family Band, recounting her experience as the youngest of the Bower children, her family's brass band, and their journey from Missouri to their frontier life in the Black Hills.

Walt Disney sought the Sherman Brothers to help on the project, feeling the story was too flat. The Shermans wrote the song "The One and Only, Genuine, Original Family Band", which ultimately became the title of the motion picture. After hearing the song, Disney decided to add more songs to the film and turn it into a musical. In all, the Sherman Brothers wrote eleven songs for the film, although Robert Sherman reportedly did so under protest, believing the subject matter too mundane to be made into a feature-length musical film.

The film reunited Lesley Ann Warren and John Davidson as the romantic leads in a Disney live-action musical, having previously been paired in The Happiest Millionaire (1967). Disney brought back Walter Brennan from The Gnome-Mobile (1967) (starring the Mary Poppins (1964) kids Karen Dotrice and Matthew Garber) to play Grandpa Bower because the actor reminded Walt of his father.

Actor and comedian Wally Cox makes the first of his several appearances in a Walt Disney production.

=== Kurt Russell and Goldie Hawn ===
Kurt Russell and Goldie Hawn first met during production of this film; at the time, Russell, six years Hawn's junior, was still a teenager. Seventeen years later, however, they met again during a rehearsal for the film Swing Shift (1984), hit it off, began dating, and have been a couple ever since.

== Theatrical release and reception ==
The film premiered at Radio City Music Hall in New York City. Originally intended to run 156 minutes, the Music Hall requested 20 minutes of cuts. Disney responded by cutting the film by 46 minutes to 110 minutes, excising the songs "Westerinʼ", sung by Calvin (Buddy Ebsen) and "I Couldn't Have Dreamed it Better", sung by Katie (Janet Blair). The Sherman Brothers and producer Bill Anderson objected, but the studio heads told them the cuts would be just for the Music Hall's engagement. Robert B. Sherman pointed out that the Music Hall is where New York film critics screen musical films, arguing that the cuts weakened the characters' dramatic motivation. He also predicted that those cuts would result in negative reviews.

Radio City Music Hall got its way, however, and the 110-minute version was the only one that was ever released. Sherman's predictions came true when The New York Times' critic Renata Adler panned the film after seeing it at the Music Hall, calling the film "about as pepless and fizzled a musical as has ever come out of the Walt Disney Studios".

As of 2014, Disney has made no attempt at a reconstruction of the originally intended cut, but sheet music of the two cut songs was still included in the book Disney's Lost Chords, Volume 2.

=== Reception from other critics ===
The film fared no better among most other major critics. Variety described it as "an overly-contrived feature which soon forgets its promise and premise and turns instead to a political mishmash of events which has little novelty".

Charles Champlin of The Los Angeles Times wrote that the film: "...is, I am afraid, the worst Disney movie in a long time." According to Champlin, the film did have some: "...pleasant, chirpy tunes [that] can't overcome the lack of any real dramatic conflict, even at the level appropriate to musical comedy, nor the lack of an interesting central character."

Clifford Terry of the Chicago Tribune called it: "...another Walt Disney studio production that isn't designed to appease squirmy family audiences, since it is filled with a flurry of limpid songs, Brennan's tiresome tirades, and the Warren - Davidson 'mush'."

Edgar J. Driscoll Jr. of The Boston Globe said the film: "...flats like a tubeless tuba — if there is such a thing. Not that the kids won't enjoy it. They will. But for adults the sasparilla may go down the wrong way. Certainly it's no runner-up to 'Mary Poppins' or 'The Sound of Music'. Not by a long shot, though the pitch is definitely aimed that-a-way."

One positive review of the film came from Lou Cedrone, who remarked in Baltimore's Evening Sun newspaper: "The Walt Disney studios have done with 'The One and Only, Genuine, Original Family Band' what they tried and failed to do with 'The Happiest Millionaire'. That is, the film is pleasant in the Disney tradition and what's more, the songs and dancing, the latter choreographed by Hugh Lambert, are especially nice."

=== Box office and television airing ===
Bringing in US$2,250,000 in rentals, the film was never reissued to theaters. Instead, it aired on The Wonderful World of Disney in two parts on January 23 and January 30, 1972, respectively.

== Home media ==
While a planned 1979 MCA DiscoVision release with the catalog number D18-513 was cancelled, the film was released on videotape in 1981 and on LaserDisc in 1982.

On July 6, 2004, after 20 years of unavailability, the film was released on DVD. Although the transfer was not in the original aspect ratio, it included an audio commentary from Richard M. Sherman, Lesley Ann Warren, and John Davidson, along with a 12-minute making-of featurette featuring all three.

== See also ==
- Michael O'Herlihy

== Bibliography ==
- Gheiz, Didier (2009). Walt's People - Volume 8. Vol. 8. Xlibris Corporation. pp. 203, 206–207, 247.
- Schroder, Russell (2008). Disney's Lost Chords Volume 2. Vol. 2. Robbinsville, North Carolina: Voigt Publications. pp. 17–25.
- Sherman, Robert B. (1998). Walt's Time: from before to beyond. Santa Clarita: Camphor Tree Publishers. pp. 148–149.
- Van Nuys, Laura Bower (1961). The Family Band : from the Missouri to the Black Hills, 1881-1900. Pioneer Heritage Series, vol. 5. Vol. 5. Lincoln: University of Nebraska Press.
