= Hot Rods to Hell =

1967 film by John Brahm

- 1967 US Theatrical Poster
- Directed by: John Brahm
- Written by: Alex Gaby; Robert E. Kent
- Produced by: Sam Katzman
- Starring: Dana Andrews; Jeanne Crain; Paul Bertoya; Mimsy Farmer; Laurie Mock; Gene Kirkwood
- Cinematography: Lloyd Ahern
- Edited by: Ben Lewis
- Music by: Fred Karger; Ben Weisman
- Distributed by: Metro-Goldwyn-Mayer
- Release date: January 27, 1967
- Running time: 92 minutes
- Country: United States
- Language: English
- Box office: $1,268,000 (rentals)

Hot Rods to Hell is a 1967 American suspense film, the last by director John Brahm. The film was based on a 1956 Saturday Evening Post story by Alex Gaby, "52 Miles to Terror", which was the working title of the film.

ABC bought the broadcast rights and aired the film as part of its ABC Sunday Night Movie series in 1968, using a 100-minute print. When Turner Classic Movies bought the rights to MGM's extensive film library, they acquired the 100-minute print.

== Plot ==
Traveling salesman Tom Phillips (Dana Andrews) is driving home to Boston, Massachusetts for Christmas when he encounters a drunken driver on a rain-streaked road. He cannot avoid a collision, and is hospitalized with spinal damage. Since he can no longer be a traveling salesman, his brother arranges for Tom to buy a remote motel in the desert town of Mayville, California. Tom is reluctant because he has never been an innkeeper before, but he decides that he must travel in order to get as far away from the site of his accident as possible, as soon as possible.

Tom sets out for California with his wife, teenage daughter and son. But when they reach the desert, they are accosted by a pair of drag racers and a "party girl" in a modified, high-performance 1958 Chevrolet Corvette who jokingly force them to swerve and avoid a collision.

A series of escalating encounters with the local youth ensues. Teenage children of relatively well-to-do local farmers, they are bored and constantly seeking thrills. The adults, including the owner of a local filling station, are fed up with them. However, one of these adults owns the motel that Tom Phillips has bought, and he is selling out after having let the wayward youth use the motel as an illicit trysting place for years.

When Tom tells the filling-station owner that he has "just bought himself a motel," one of the kids named Ernie (Gene Kirkwood) overhears. Soon after, he tells his friend Duke (Paul Bertoya), who is the driver of the Corvette. Duke organizes a campaign of harassment against Tom and chases the hapless family all the way to the motel.

Matters come to a dangerous head when Tom's daughter (Laurie Mock), fascinated by Duke, goes to see him in the motel bar and grill, called the Arena. Duke's current girlfriend Gloria (Mimsy Farmer), in a jealous rage, informs Tom, who tries to strangle Duke, but his back goes out and he must desist. He then informs the former motel owner (George Ives) that he will not go through with the sale. This causes a confrontation between the former owner and the youths, which ends when the owner tells Duke and Ernie that Tom is going to the next town to "bring the police down on this place."

Duke and Ernie resolve never to let Tom Phillips reach that town, and so, as the family tries to escape, they engage them in a deadly game of "chicken." This game ends only when Tom outwits the teenagers by parking his car on a narrow bridge, with the headlights on, evacuating him and his family to a safe spot 20 yards off the road. Faced with an unmoving object, Duke turns "chicken" himself, running his car off the edge of the bridge, after which he and Ernie, bruised, battered and with scraped knees, swear that they will never give Tom any trouble. Tom agrees not to turn them in to the police, but tells them that he will go back to his motel and run it properly from now on.

== Cast ==
- Dana Andrews as Tom Phillips
- Jeanne Crain as Peg Phillips, his wife
- Paul Bertoya as Duke, leader of the wayward youth
- Gene Kirkwood as Ernie, Duke's sidekick
- Mimsy Farmer as Gloria, Duke's girlfriend
- Laurie Mock as Tina, Tom Phillips' daughter
- Jeffrey Bryon (credited as Tim Stafford) as Jamie, Tom Phillips' son
- George Ives as Lank Dailey, owner of Dailey's Motel and the Arena roadhouse
- William Mims as Man at Picnic
- Hortense Petra and Peter Oliphant as his wife and son
- Paul Genge as an unnamed California Highway Patrol officer
- Charles P. Thompson as Charley, the elderly filling-station owner
- Harry Hickox as Bill, Tom Phillips' brother
- Arthur Tovey as Man Seated at Bar

== Background and production ==
Because the film was originally intended for television release, it was shot in 4:3 aspect ratio rather than in the standard widescreen format of most feature films. However, when the project was finished, its producers deemed it too intense for television and released it to theaters instead, with a running time of 92 minutes.

== Filming locations ==
The film was shot largely near the Southern California desert town Lake Los Angeles and Wilsona Gardens, east of Palmdale, California. Specific locations include Charlie's Last Chance gas station (34°40′15.27″N 117°49′37.88″W), 150th Street E, where a majority of chase scenes were filmed (34°38′31.45″N 117°51′46.25″W) and the narrow bridge, constructed by the film crew, where the crash occurs at the end of the film (34°38′43.59″N 117°51′46.58″W). The Arena exteriors were filmed in Calabasas, California at a place then known as Billingsley's Steak Ranch, near the intersection of Highway 101 and Las Virgenes Road. The buildings as seen in the film were demolished in 1975, but the location is 34°08′49.51″N 118°41′54.20″W.

== Reception ==
Hot Rods to Hell received nearly universal scorn from critics but had a profitable run, given its very modest budget, grossing over a million dollars. It received no major award nominations. Over the years, Hot Rods to Hell developed a cult following and has a website devoted to it.

The film is the fourth and final collaboration between State Fair (1945) couple Dana Andrews and Jeanne Crain, who play the parents/protagonists. Their other films are Duel in the Jungle (1954) and Madison Avenue (1961).

Warner Brothers released a series of unconnected hot-rod-based films, including Hot Rod, Hot Rod Gang and Hot Rod Girl. All share the same theme of teenagers risking their lives in fast cars, and convey a message about the dangers of fast driving. Of these films, only Hot Rod and Hot Rods To Hell have seen an official Warner Archives DVD release. Hot Rods To Hell is the only feature of these films in which the teenagers are the villains.

== Home media ==
Hot Rods to Hell was released on Region 1 DVD on June 26, 2007, by Warner Home Video. The DVD has been modified from the original 4:3 (1.33:1) aspect ratio to a widescreen format of 16:9 (approximately 1.85:1). This was accomplished by cropping the top and bottom of the frame.

== See also ==
- List of American films of 1967
