= The Moonglow Affair =

- The Man from U.N.C.L.E. episode
- Episode no.: Season 2 Episode 23
- Directed by: Joseph Sargent
- Written by: Dean Hargrove
- Editing by: Henry Berman
- Original air date: February 25, 1966
- Running time: 50 min

Guest appearances
- Mary Ann Mobley as April Dancer; Norman Fell as Mark Slate; Kevin McCarthy as Arthur Caresse; Mary Carver as Jean Caresse

Episode chronology
← Previous "The Foreign Legion Affair"	Next → "The Nowhere Affair"

"The Moonglow Affair" is the 52nd episode of the NBC television series The Man from U.N.C.L.E. This episode served as the pilot for the spin-off series The Girl from U.N.C.L.E.

== Plot ==
While investigating a T.H.R.U.S.H. plot to sabotage space shots, Solo and Illya are incapacitated by a quartzite radiation projector. Waverly assigns new trainee April Dancer, along with agent Mark Slate (who is past the age of retirement for enforcement agents), to find the antidote and destroy the plan. April infiltrates the cosmetics company of T.H.R.U.S.H. agent Arthur Caresse as a model, but she is uncovered by Caresse's sister Jean.

== Notes ==
- The characters of April Dancer and Mark Slate, who are played by Mary Ann Mobley and Norman Fell in this episode, are played by Stefanie Powers and Noel Harrison in The Girl from U.N.C.L.E.
- In the episode, "Moonglow" is the name of a Caresse cosmetic product, a lipstick that glows in the dark.
