= Reino Häyhänen =

KGB officer who defected to US (1920–1961)

- Рейно Хейханен
- Undated photograph of Reino Häyhänen
- Born: May 14, 1920; Kaskisaari, Saint Petersburg Governorate, Russian SFSR
- Died: February 17, 1961 (aged 40); Pennsylvania, United States
- Military career
- Allegiance: Soviet Union (1939–1957)
- Branch: NKVD (1939–1946); MGB (1946–1954); KGB (1954–1957)
- Rank: Lieutenant Colonel
- Conflicts: World War II: Winter War

Reino Häyhänen (Russian: Рейно Хейханен; May 14, 1920 – February 17, 1961) was a Soviet intelligence officer of the KGB who defected from the Soviet Union to the United States in May 1957. Häyhänen surrendered information on Soviet espionage activities that solved the Hollow Nickel Case for the FBI, and led to the arrest of his KGB partner Rudolf Abel and other Soviet spies in the United States and Canada.

== Early life ==
Reino Häyhänen was born on May 14, 1920, in the village of Kaskisaari in Saint Petersburg Governorate, Russian Soviet Federative Socialist Republic, into an Ingrian Finnish peasant family. Häyhänen rose above his modest background to become an honor student and, in 1939, obtained the equivalent of a certificate to teach in high school, and in September was appointed to the faculty of a primary school in the village of Lipitsy. However, two months later, Häyhänen was conscripted by the NKVD, the secret police of the Soviet Union, following the Soviet invasion of Finland starting the Winter War. Häyhänen was assigned as an interpreter for an NKVD group due to his Finnish background and fluency in the Finnish language, and sent to the combat zone to translate captured Finnish documents and interrogate Finnish prisoners. At the end of the Winter War in March 1940, Häyhänen was assigned to check the loyalty and reliability of workers in the occupied territory of Karelia, and to develop informants and sources of information in their midst. His primary objective was to identify pro-Finnish and pro-Capitalist elements among the intelligentsia.

Häyhänen became a respected expert in Finnish intelligence matters and in May 1943, was accepted into membership in the Communist Party of the Soviet Union. Following World War II, Häyhänen rose to the rank of senior operative authorized representative of the Segozerski district section of the People's Commissariat for State Security (NKGB) and, with headquarters in the village of Padany in the Karelian ASSR, set about the task of identifying dissident elements among the local citizens.

In the summer of 1948, Häyhänen was called to Moscow by the Ministry of State Security (MGB), the successor agency of the NKVD, where he met his wife, Akulina Pavlova. The Soviet intelligence service had a new assignment for Häyhänen - one which would require him to sever relations with his family, to study the English language, and to receive special training in photographing documents, as well as to encode and decode messages.

While his training continued, Häyhänen worked as a mechanic in the city of Valga, Estonia. In the summer of 1949, Häyhänen entered Finland via the Soviet naval base in Porkkala as Eugene Nicolai Mäki, an American-born laborer, and would later be stationed in the United States.

== Defection ==
Häyhänen defected from the Soviet Union in Paris on the way back to Moscow after being recalled from the United States for good. In May 1957, Häyhänen telephoned the United States Embassy in Paris and arrived at the Embassy for an interview. He said: "I'm an officer in the Soviet intelligence service. For the past five years, I have been operating in the United States. Now I need your help." He had been ordered to return to Moscow, after five years in the United States, and now wanted to defect.

=== Hollow Nickel Case ===
Häyhänen's defection allowed the Federal Bureau of Investigation (FBI) to solve the Hollow Nickel Case, which had been opened in June 1953: the nickel contained microfilm with a series of numbers on it, but the FBI had been unable to discover its provenance or decode the numbers. With Häyhänen's help, the FBI was able to link the nickel to agents of the KGB, the successor agency of the MGB, including Mikhail Nikolaevich Svirin (a former United Nations employee) and Vilyam Genrikhovich Fisher, a.k.a. Rudolph Ivanovich Abel. The deciphered message in the nickel turned out to be worthless: a personal message to Häyhänen from the KGB in Moscow welcoming him to the U.S. and instructing him on getting set up. However, Häyhänen would give the FBI the information that it needed to crack the cipher, uncover the identity of his two main contacts in New York City (Svirin and Fisher), and a nearly identically-made Finnish 50 mark coin. In addition to Svirin and Fisher (code name "Mark"), Häyhänen (code name "Vic") told the FBI about Vitali G. Pavlov, onetime Soviet embassy official in Ottawa, Canada; Aleksandr Mikhailovich Korotkov; and United States Army Sergeant, Roy Rhodes (code name "Quebec"), who had once worked in the garage of the U.S. embassy in Moscow. The KGB was able to get to Rhodes because it had "compromising materials" about him. Häyhänen and Fisher were in the United States mainly looking for information on the Manhattan Project and United States Navy submarine information. James B. Donovan, the lawyer of Rudolf Abel, referred to Häyhänen as a "a professional liar, a pathological alcoholic, a bigamist, and a thief" during his defence in court. Häyhänen avoided charges of espionage despite efforts from Donovan, and later lived in New Hampshire under |the protection of the Central Intelligence Agency (CIA).

== Death ==
Häyhänen died in a car crash on the Pennsylvania Turnpike on February 17, 1961. The New York Journal-American and other newspapers published obituaries for Häyhänen stating that he died in an accident in Pennsylvania, but author Phillip J. Bigger described the circumstances as "mysterious" in his book Negotiator: The Life and Career of James B. Donovan. Häyhänen's death has been theorized to be an assassination committed by Soviet intelligence agencies.

== See also ==
- VIC cipher
- Hollow Nickel Case
- Rudolf Abel
- List of Eastern Bloc defectors
