= Mister Roberts (TV series) =

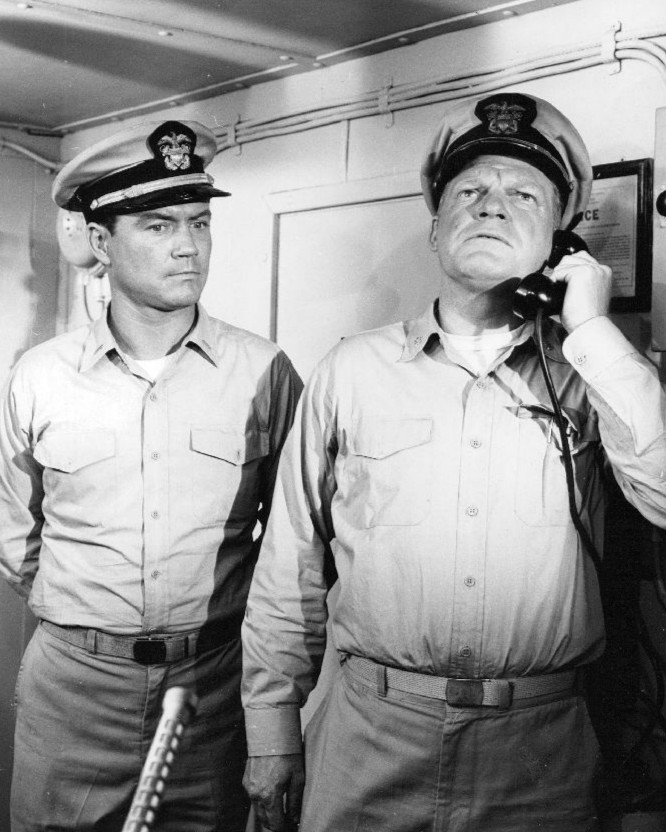
- Roger Smith and Richard X. Slattery.
- Genre: Sitcom
- Written by: Richard Baer; Bob Barbash; Bobby Bell; Robert C. Dennis; Herman Groves; Thomas Heggen; Ed Jurist; Bill Lee; Lee Loeb; Douglas Morrow; James O'Hanlon; Ken Pettus; Don Tait
- Directed by: James Komack; Allen Baron; Robert Butler; Lawrence Dobkin; Richard Kinon; Leslie H. Martinson; Gene Reynolds; Seymour Robbie; William Wiard
- Starring: Roger Smith; Richard X. Slattery; Steve Harmon; George Ives; Ray Reese; Richard Sinatra
- Theme music composer: Frank Perkins and Stan Kenton
- Composers: Johnny Mandel; Gordon Bau (make-up)
- Country of origin: United States
- Original language: English
- No. of seasons: 1
- No. of episodes: 30

Production
- Executive producer: William T. Orr
- Producer: James Komack
- Camera setup: Multi-camera
- Running time: 22–24 minutes
- Production company: Warner Bros. Television Division

Original release
- Network: NBC
- Release: September 17, 1965 – April 8, 1966

Related
- Mister Roberts (novel); Mister Roberts (play); Mister Roberts (1955 film)

Mister Roberts is an American sitcom that aired on NBC from September 17, 1965 to September 2, 1966. Based on the best selling 1946 novel, 1948 play, and the 1955 film of the same name, the series stars Roger Smith in the title role and Richard X. Slattery as the ship's captain.

== Synopsis ==
Set during World War II, the series chronicled the adventures of the crew of the USS Reluctant AK-601 cargo ship. Produced by Warner Bros. Television, Mister Roberts was executive produced by William T. Orr. The series' theme song was composed by Frank Perkins.

Lieutenant Roberts found life on a cargo ship monotonous, and he wanted to get transferred to another ship so he could participate more fully in the war effort. Ensign Pulver was constantly trying to liven up the ship's routine, and most of the crew were looking for ways to drive stern Captain Morton out of his mind.

Featuring a cast of Warner Bros. Television stars and unknowns, the series aired on Fridays at 9:30 and was canceled after its first season due to low ratings.

== Cast ==
- Roger Smith as Lieutenant Douglas Roberts
- Steve Harmon as Ensign Frank Pulver
- George Ives as Doc
- Ray Reese as Seaman Reber
- Richard Sinatra as Seaman D'Angelo
- Richard X. Slattery as Captain John Morton
- Ronald Starr as Seaman Mannion

== Episodes ==
=== Season One (1965-66) ===
Episode #	Episode title	Directed by	Written by	Original airdate
1-1	"Bookser's Honeymoon"	Fielder Cook	James O'Hanlon	September 17, 1965
1–2	"Liberty"	James Komack	Ed Jurist	September 24, 1965
1–3	"Physician, Heal Thyself"	Robert Butler	Lee Loeb & Ken Pettus	October 1, 1965
1–4	"The Conspiracy"	TBA	Herman Groves	October 8, 1965
1–5	"Old Rustysides"	Lawrence Dobkin	Don Tait	October 15, 1965
1–6	"Lover, Come Forward"	Gene Reynolds	James O'Hanlon	October 22, 1965
1–7	"The Captain's Party"	TBA	Earl Barret & Robert C. Dennis	October 29, 1965
1–8	"Happy Birthday, To Who?"	Richard Kinon	Bob Barbash	November 5, 1965
1–9	"Love at 78 RPM"	Seymour Robbie	Ken Pettus & Leo Rifkin	November 12, 1965
1–10	"Don't Look Now, But Isn't That the War?"	Robert Butler	Douglas Morrow	November 19, 1965
1–11	"Which Way Did the War Go?"	Robert Butler	Douglas Morrow	November 26, 1965
1–12	"Getting There Is Half the Fun"	Robert Butler	Douglas Morrow	December 3, 1965
1–13	"Dear Mom"	William Wiard	Lee Loeb	December 10, 1965
1–14	"The Reluctant Mutiny"	Seymour Robbie	Ken Pettus and Arnold & Lois Peyser	December 17, 1965
1–15	"Rock-A-Bye Reluctant"	TBA	Story by: Lee Orgel & Sam Ross, Teleplay by: Ken Pettus	December 24, 1965
1–16	"Carry Me Back to Cocoa Island"	Lawrence Dobkin	Richard Baer & Don Tait	December 31, 1965
1–17	"The Replacement"	William Wiard	Story by: James Komack, Teleplay by: Ken Pettus	January 7, 1966
1–18	"Black and Blue Market"	William Wiard	Ken Pettus	January 14, 1966
1–19	"The World's Greatest Lover"	Seymour Robbie	Herman Groves & Ken Pettus	January 21, 1966
1–20	"Eight In Every Port"	Leslie H. Martinson	Don Tait	January 28, 1966
1–21	"The Super Chief"	Seymour Robbie	Ken Pettus	February 4, 1966
1–22	"The Doctor's Dilemma"	Allen Baron	Douglas Morrow	February 11, 1966
1–23	"The Reluctant Draggin'"	Seymour Robbie	Douglas Morrow	February 18, 1966
1–24	"#*@% the Torpedoes!"	Seymour Robbie	Herman Groves & Ken Pettus	February 25, 1966
1–25	"A Turn For the Nurse"	Leslie H. Martinson	Douglas Morrow	March 4, 1966
1–26	"Son of 'Eight In Every Port'"	William Wiard	Phil Leslie & Ken Pettus	March 11, 1966
1–27	"Unwelcome Aboard"	Seymour Robbie	Story by: James Komack, Teleplay by: Bobby Bell & Bill Lee	March 18, 1966
1–28	"Undercover Cook"	Seymour Robbie	Story by: Roger Smith, Telelplay by: Ken Pettus	March 25, 1966
1–29	"In Love and War"	Leslie H. Martinson	Don Tait	April 1, 1966
1–30	"Captain, My—Captain?"	Lesie H. Martinson	Ken Pettus	April 8, 1966
