= Hollow Nickel Case =

FBI investigation concerning Russian espionage

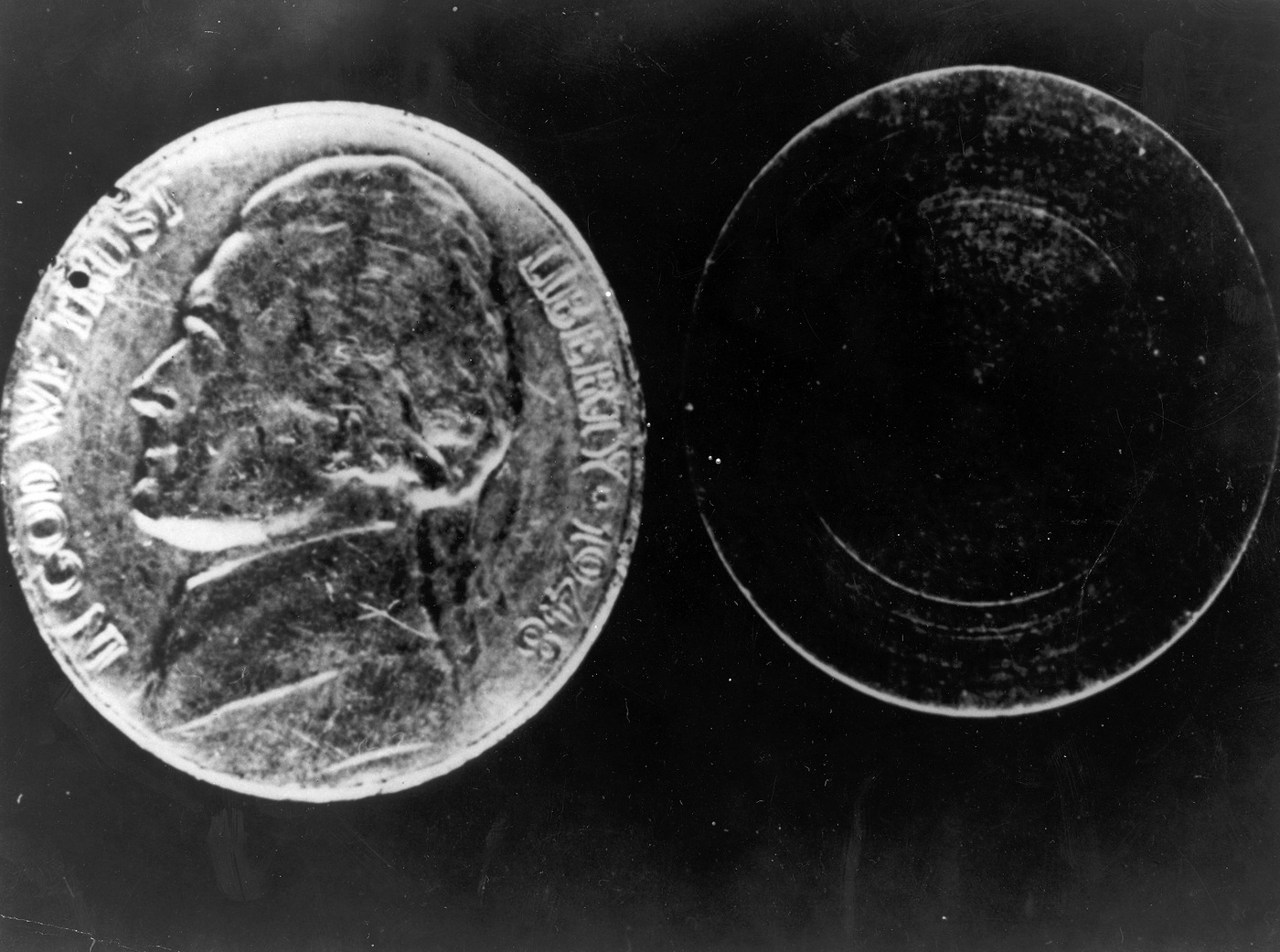
The hollowed-out nickel

The Hollow Nickel Case (or the Hollow Coin) was the FBI investigation that grew out of the discovery of a container disguised as a U.S. coin and containing a coded message, eventually found to concern the espionage activities of William August Fisher, a.k.a. Rudolf Ivanovich Abel, on behalf of the Soviet Union.

== Background ==
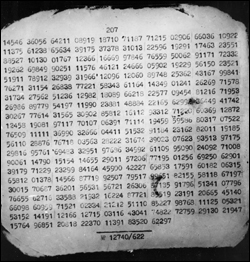
Ciphered message contained in the nickel

On June 22, 1953, Jimmy Bozart, a fourteen-year-old newspaper boy collecting for the Brooklyn Eagle, at an apartment building at 3403 Foster Avenue in the New York City borough of Brooklyn, was paid with a nickel (U.S. five-cent piece) that felt too light to him. When he dropped it on the ground, it popped open, revealing that it contained microfilm. The microfilm contained a series of numbers. He told the daughter of a New York City Police Department officer, and that officer told a detective who, in two days, told an FBI agent about the strange nickel.

After agent Louis Hahn of the FBI obtained the nickel and the microfilm, the agency tried to find out from where the nickel had come and what the numbers meant. The coin had a 1948-dated obverse with the usual copper-nickel composition, but the reverse was minted sometime between October 1942 and the end of 1945, based on the copper-silver alloys used during this period (nickel was needed for the war effort). On the microfilm, there were five digits together in each number, 21 sets of five in seven columns and another 20 sets in three columns, making a total of 207 sets of five digits. There was no key for the numbers. The FBI tried for nearly four years to find the origin of the nickel and the meaning of the numbers.

It was only when KGB agent Reino Häyhänen, a.k.a. Eugene Nicolai Mäki, chose to defect in May 1957 that the FBI was able to link the nickel to the KGB. Häyhänen had been operating in the United States for some time, but had been recalled to Moscow for good, and did not want to go. He defected in Paris, on the way back to Russia.

The nickel, it turned out, was an item that Häyhänen had collected from a dead-drop, but which he had accidentally spent before opening it. Häyhänen gave the FBI the information that it needed to crack the cipher — the deciphered message in the nickel turned out to be a message to Häyhänen from the KGB in Moscow, welcoming him to the U.S. and instructing him on getting set up:

1. WE CONGRATULATE YOU ON A SAFE ARRIVAL. WE CONFIRM THE RECEIPT OF YOUR LETTER TO THE ADDRESS `V REPEAT V' AND THE READING OF LETTER NUMBER 1.
2. FOR ORGANIZATION OF COVER, WE GAVE INSTRUCTIONS TO TRANSMIT TO YOU THREE THOUSAND IN LOCAL (CURRENCY). CONSULT WITH US PRIOR TO INVESTING IT IN ANY KIND OF BUSINESS, ADVISING THE CHARACTER OF THIS BUSINESS.
3. ACCORDING TO YOUR REQUEST, WE WILL TRANSMIT THE FORMULA FOR THE PREPARATION OF SOFT FILM AND NEWS SEPARATELY, TOGETHER WITH (YOUR) MOTHER'S LETTER.
4. IT IS TOO EARLY TO SEND YOU THE GAMMAS. ENCIPHER SHORT LETTERS, BUT THE LONGER ONES MAKE WITH INSERTIONS. ALL THE DATA ABOUT YOURSELF, PLACE OF WORK, ADDRESS, ETC., MUST NOT BE TRANSMITTED IN ONE CIPHER MESSAGE. TRANSMIT INSERTIONS SEPARATELY.
5. THE PACKAGE WAS DELIVERED TO YOUR WIFE PERSONALLY. EVERYTHING IS ALL RIGHT WITH THE FAMILY. WE WISH YOU SUCCESS. GREETINGS FROM THE COMRADES. NUMBER 1, 3RD OF DECEMBER.

Häyhänen, whose code name was "Vic", told the FBI about a number of Soviet operatives in North America, including Vitali G. Pavlov, a former Soviet embassy official in Ottawa; Aleksandr Mikhaylovich Korotkov; and U.S. Army Sergeant Roy Rhodes (code name "Quebec"), who had once worked in the garage of the U.S. embassy in Moscow. The Soviets were able to get to Rhodes because they had "compromising materials" about him.

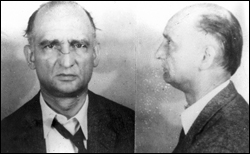
FBI mugshot of William August Fisher, a.k.a. Rudolf Ivanovich Abel

More importantly, Häyhänen helped the FBI uncover the identity of his two main contacts in New York: Mikhail Nikolaevich Svirin (a former United Nations employee) and William August Fisher, whose code name was "Mark". Svirin had returned to the Soviet Union in October 1956 and was not available for questioning or arrest, but Fisher was still working in the United States, principally seeking information on the U.S. atomic program and U.S. Navy submarine information.

With Häyhänen's help, the FBI identified and arrested Fisher in Brooklyn; the hotel room and photo studio in which he lived contained multiple items of modern espionage equipment — cameras and film for producing microdots, cipher pads, cufflinks, a hollow shaving brush, shortwave radios, and numerous "trick" containers.

Fisher, who gave the authorities the name Rudolf Ivanovich Abel, was brought to trial in New York City Federal Court and indicted as a Soviet spy in October 1957 on three counts:

- Conspiracy to transmit defense information to the Soviet Union
- Conspiracy to obtain defense information
- Conspiracy to act in the United States as an agent of a foreign government without notification to the Secretary of State.

Häyhänen testified against Fisher at the trial.

On October 25, 1957, the jury found "Abel" guilty on all three counts. On November 15, 1957, Judge Mortimer W. Byers sentenced Fisher to three sentences to be served concurrently:

- 30 years' imprisonment;
- 10 years' imprisonment and $2,000 fine;
- 5 years' imprisonment and $1,000 fine.

On February 10, 1962, after more than four years of his sentence, Fisher was brought to Berlin and exchanged for American Central Intelligence Agency Lockheed U-2 pilot Francis Gary Powers, who was a prisoner of the Soviet Union.

== In popular culture ==
The case has been dramatized multiple times, including

- The 1959 film The FBI Story, starring James Stewart, with personal supervision by FBI director J. Edgar Hoover.
  - The film compresses the time span from four years to just a couple of weeks, the Brooklyn newspaper boy is changed to a small Bronx clothes cleaning and pressing service, and changes the nickel to a half dollar.
- A December 1962 episode of the Jack Webb television series GE True, titled "The Wrong Nickel".
- The Steven Spielberg film Bridge of Spies, released in October 2015.
  - The film culminates with the later prisoner exchange of Abel and Francis Gary Powers of the 1960 U-2 incident.
- A March 2016 episode of the American Heroes Channel's series What History Forgot, titled "Fighting for Freedom".
  - The episode focuses on Jimmy Bozart's role in breaking the case.

== See also ==
- Concealment device
- VIC cipher
