= Paul Genge =

American actor (1913–1988)

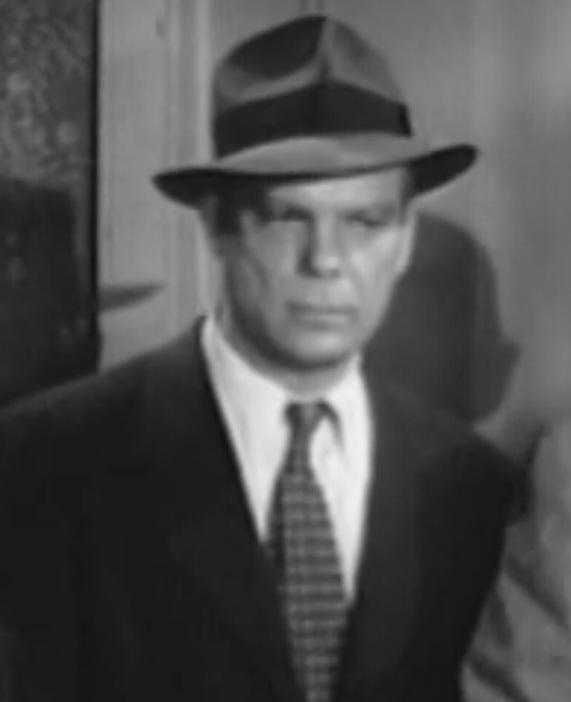
- Genge in an episode of Man Against Crime (1953)
- Born: Paul Morgan Genge; March 29, 1913
- Died: May 13, 1988 (aged 75); Los Angeles, California, U.S.
- Resting place: Los Angeles National Cemetery
- Occupation: Actor
- Years active: 1951–1975
- Spouse: Rowena Kirkpatrick (m. 1944)

Paul Morgan Genge (March 29, 1913 – May 13, 1988) was an American actor active from the 1950s to the late 1970s.

== Early years ==
Genge's parents were Mr. and Mrs. Edward C. Genge. During World War II he served in the United States Army Air Corps. While he was stationed at Geiger Field in 1942 he acted with the Little Theater in Spokane, Washington.

== Film and television ==
Genge is most famous for his role as the shotgun toting gray-haired mob hitman 'Mike' in the 1968 film Bullitt (his character is the passenger in the black 1968 Dodge Charger during the famous car chase that goes out of control and causes his death and the driver's). Other film roles include that of a payoff man in The Outfit (1973); a California Highway Patrol officer in 1967's Hot Rods to Hell; Whitey, a communist suspect in The FBI Story (1959); and Lieutenant Hagerman in Alfred Hitchcock's North By Northwest (1959). He also appeared on many television shows from the 1950s, 1960s, and 1970s. He played in four episodes of Perry Mason, starring Raymond Burr; in three of the roles he played a law-enforcement officer, such as San Francisco Inspector Wade in "The Case of the Poison Pen Pal" in 1962. In his final appearance in 1966 he played Bud in "The Case of the Sausalito Sunrise". In that episode he and his comrade, in attempting to hijack goods from a truck driven by Paul Drake, are killed when their car loses control and rolls down the cliff.

== Stage ==
Genge was a member of a touring company that presented Hamlet in 19 cities in the United States in 1937. He had the title role in the Barter Theatre's production of King Henry IV in 1939. In 1940 he acted with the Playwrights' Company in Brooklyn. In addition to acting on stage, Genge directed Hamlet in Hartford, Connecticut. He also wrote two plays, How to Fix an Ice Box and The Last Minstrel, that were produced. An advocate for regional theater. he financed a bus tour of the United States in 1963 to promote regional theater. He encouraged theatrical groups within a region to cooperate to find new plays to present. Genge's Broadway credits included Panic (1935), Hamlet (1936), Journey to Jerusalem (1940), Romeo and Juliet (1951) and Bernardine (1952).

== Personal life ==
Genge married Rowena Kirkpatrick in Warrenton, Virginia, on November 28, 1944.

Genge died in Los Angeles, California and was buried in Los Angeles National Cemetery.

== Filmography ==
Year	Title	Role	Notes
1958	I Want to Live!	Police Inspector	Uncredited
1958	The Walter Winchell File	Lieutenant Buchanan	Season 1 Episode 16: "The High Window"
1959	The Beat Generation	Police Captain Wilson	Uncredited
1959	North By Northwest	Lieutenant Hagerman	Uncredited
1959	The FBI Story	Whitey, a Suspect	
1960	Because They're Young	Coach Al Pekarek	Uncredited
1960	The Crowded Sky	Samuel N. Poole	
1963	The Alfred Hitchcock Hour	Lieutenant Tom Mills	Season 1 Episode 32: "Death of a Cop"
1964	The Americanization of Emily	Officer	Uncredited
1965	Young Dillinger	Police Detective	Uncredited
1965	The Sandpiper	Architect	Uncredited
1967	Hot Rods to Hell	Policeman	
1968	Blackbeard's Ghost	Casino Manager	Uncredited
1968	The Green Berets	General Thomas	Uncredited
1968	Bullitt	Mike, shotgun killer	
1973	The Outfit	Pay-Off Man	
