= The Jim Backus Show =

American television series

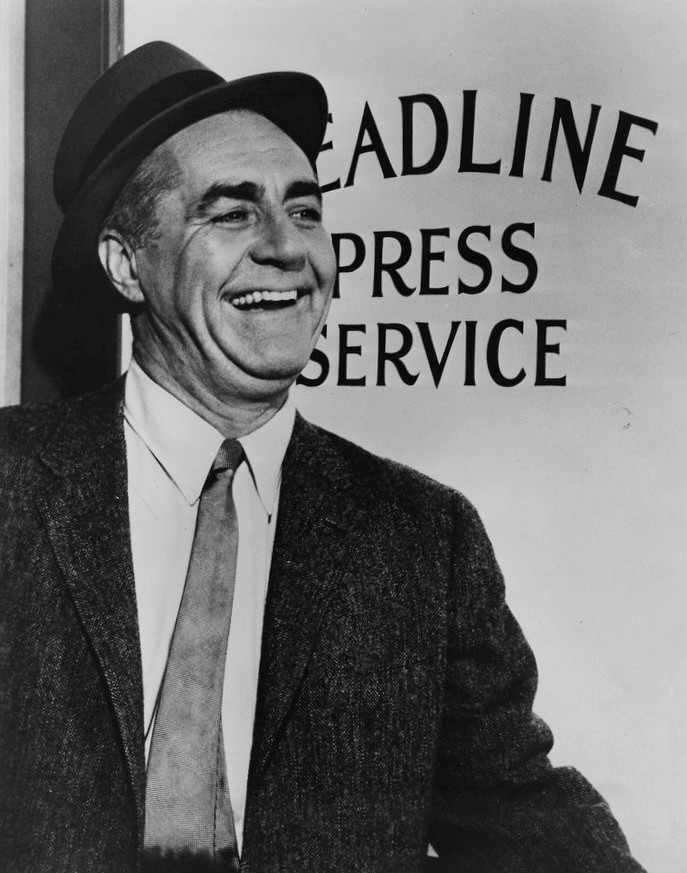
- Jim Backus as Mike O'Toole.
- Starring: Jim Backus
- Country of origin: United States
- Original language: English
- No. of seasons: 1
- No. of episodes: 39

Production
- Running time: 30 minutes
- Production company: California National Productions

Original release
- Release: October 6, 1960 – July 11, 1961

The Jim Backus Show is an American television sitcom that aired in broadcast syndication in 1960 and 1961. The series was also known as Hot Off the Wire.

== Premise ==
The program focuses on Backus in the role of Mike O'Toole, the editor/proprietor of a low rent wire service struggling to stay in business.

== Cast ==
- Jim Backus as Mike O'Toole
- Nita Talbot as Dora Miles
- Bobs Watson as Sidney

== Episodes ==
- "The Woman's Touch" with George Ives as a bigamist con man, Douglas Aldrich.
- "Floundered in Florida" with Alan Carney as Hogan, Milton Frome as Irving Rudolph, Vivi Janiss as Mrs. Rudolph, and Olan Soule as Elmo

No.	Title	Directed by	Written by	Original release date
1	"The Mad Bomber"	John Florea	John L. Greene	October 6, 1960
2	"The Patriots"	Bretaigne Windust	Dick Conway & Roland MacLane	October 25, 1960
3	"Mike O'Toole, Angler"	Gene Reynolds	Joseph Quillan	November 1, 1960
4	"South Hampton Story"	James Sheldon	Bill Danch & Tedd Pierce	November 8, 1960
5	"No Help Wanted"	Gene Reynolds	Dick Chevillat & Jay Sommers	November 15, 1960
6	"The Marry-Go-Round"	Christian Nyby	Ray Singer	November 15, 1960
7	"The Nephew"	Hollingsworth Morse	David Chandler & Don Quinn	November 22, 1960
8	"Baby, Come Home"	Ralph Levy	Bill Danch & Tedd Pierce	November 29, 1960
9	"The Frame Up"	Christian Nyby	Dick Chevillat & Ray Singer	December 6, 1960
10	"Painting Caper"	Howard W. Koch	Dick Chevillat & Ray Singer	December 13, 1960
11	"The Three Sisters"	James Sheldon	Jess Carneol & Kay Lenard	December 16, 1960
12	"Uncle Chester"	Alan Crosland Jr.	Bill Davenport & Charles Tannen	December 20, 1960
13	"Crime a la Carte"	Theodore J. Flicker	Bill Danch & John L. Greene	December 27, 1960
14	"The Desk"	Howard W. Koch	Bill Danch & Tedd Pierce	December 27, 1960
15	"Piano Prodigy"	Christian Nyby	Hendrik Vollaerts	January 10, 1961
16	"Mike Cheats a Cheater"	James Sheldon	Peggy Chantler Dick & William Cowley	January 17, 1961
17	"Meet Melvin"	Ben Feiner Jr.	George Atkins & Bob Ogle	January 24, 1961
18	"The Woman's Touch"	Christian Nyby	Story by : Robert A. Cinader, Teleplay by : Marvin Marx & Manny Manheim	January 31, 1961
19	"Sidney's Scoop"	Hollingsworth Morse	Peggy Elliott & Tedd Pierce	February 7, 1961
20	"The Hypnotist"	Ben Feiner Jr.	Bill Danch & Tedd Pierce	February 14, 1961
21	"Once Upon a Moose"	Christian Nyby	Harry Crane & John Tackaberry	February 21, 1961
22	"Pinkmalion"	Alan Crosland Jr.	Bill Davenport & Charles Tannen	December 28, 1961
23	"When a Body Meets a Body"	Sidney Salkow	George Atkins, John O'Dea, Bob Ogle & Sidney Salkow	March 7, 1961
24	"Arabian Night"	James Sheldon	Walter Black	March 14, 1961
25	"Old Army Game"	Christian Nyby	Story by : Robert A. Cinader; Teleplay by : Stanley Davis & Elon Packard	March 21, 1961
26	"The Fix"	Arthur Lubin	Arthur Alsberg	April 4, 1961
27	"Sad Sack Santa"	Harvey Hart	Sam Locke & Joel Rapp	April 11, 1961
28	"The Plant"	James Sheldon	Story by : Jay Sommers, Teleplay by : Carol & Joseph Cavella	April 18, 1961
29	"The Temporary Scoundrel"	Theodore J. Flicker	Thomas Knickerbocker & Mort R. Lewis	April 25, 1961
30	"Floundered in Florida"	Unknown	Unknown	May 2, 1961
31	"Dear Minnie"	Unknown	Unknown	May 9, 1961
32	"In the Rough"	Unknown	Unknown	May 16, 1961
33	"Dora's Vacation"	Unknown	Unknown	May 23, 1961
34	"The Birthday Boy"	Unknown	Unknown	May 30, 1961
35	"War Bride"	Unknown	Unknown	June 13, 1961
36	"The Texas Tycoon"	Unknown	Unknown	June 20, 1961
37	"Gift for Grandma"	Unknown	Unknown	June 27, 1961
38	"O'Toole and Son"	Christian Nyby	Stanley Davis & Elon Packard	July 4, 1961
39	"Farewell to Dora"	Unknown	Unknown	July 11, 1961
