= The Girl from U.N.C.L.E. =

American spy fiction television series

- Genre: Spy fiction Action
- Created by: Norman Felton
- Directed by: Richard C. Bennett; John Brahm; Herschel Daugherty; E. Darrell Hallenbeck; Alf Kjellin; Mitchell Leisen; Sherman Marks; Leo Penn; Richard C. Sarafian; Joseph Sargent; Barry Shear; Jud Taylor
- Starring: Stefanie Powers; Noel Harrison; Leo G. Carroll; Randy Kirby
- Theme music composer: Jerry Goldsmith, arranged by Dave Grusin
- Composers: Dave Grusin; Jack Marshall; Richard Shores
- Country of origin: United States
- Original language: English
- No. of seasons: 1
- No. of episodes: 29

Production
- Executive producer: Norman Felton
- Producer: Douglas Benton
- Running time: 50 minutes
- Production companies: Arena Productions; Metro-Goldwyn-Mayer Television

Original release
- Network: NBC
- Release: September 16, 1966 – April 11, 1967

Related
- The Man from U.N.C.L.E.

The Girl from U.N.C.L.E. is an American spy fiction TV series starring Stefanie Powers that aired on NBC for one season from September 13, 1966, to April 11, 1967. The series was a spin-off from The Man from U.N.C.L.E. and used the same theme music composed by Jerry Goldsmith, in a different arrangement by Dave Grusin. The Girl from U.N.C.L.E. stars Powers as American U.N.C.L.E. agent April Dancer and Noel Harrison as her British partner, Mark Slate. Leo G. Carroll plays their superior, Alexander Waverly, an established character from the original U.N.C.L.E. series.

Despite attempts at cross-promotion with its parent series, the show failed to build an audience and lasted only one season. Its failure was considered a contributing factor in Man's mid-season cancellation in early 1968.

== Cast ==
- Stefanie Powers as April Dancer
- Noel Harrison as Mark Slate
- Leo G. Carroll as Alexander Waverly; chief of U.N.C.L.E.
- Randy Kirby as Agent Randy Kovacs

=== Notable guest stars ===
- Ed Asner
- Richard Bakalyan
- Joan Blondell
- Tom Bosley
- John Carradine
- Robert Carricart
- Jack Cassidy
- Spencer Chan
- Ellen Corby
- Wally Cox
- Yvonne De Carlo
- Dom DeLuise
- John Erwin
- Duke Fishman
- Bernard Fox
- Stan Freberg
- Kelton Garwood
- Arthur Hanson
- Steve Harmon
- Dale Ishimoto
- Boris Karloff
- Fernando Lamas
- Peggy Lee
- Raymond Massey
- Luciana Paluzzi
- Lyn Peters
- Richard Roat
- Pernell Roberts
- Ruth Roman
- Gena Rowlands
- Penny Santon
- Cosmo Sardo
- Alex Sharp
- Ann Sothern
- Olan Soule
- Olive Sturgess
- Roger Til
- Leslie Uggams
- Robert Vaughn
- Carol Wayne
- Michael Wilding

== Critical response ==
Contemporary reviews of The Girl From Uncle were mostly negative, with much of the critics' comments centered upon the lead actors, particularly Powers. A review in The Baltimore Sun noted that Powers is "prettier and shapelier than Ilya Kuryakin, of course, but she's not much of an actress and she's ill-suited to the role," but that "Harrison tends to steal scenes from Miss Powers, and [makes] an agreeable impression" A review in Newsday reported that "Miss Powers, for all of her sweater appeal, is a trifle limited." Kay Gardella of the New York Daily News opined that Powers "display[ed] less than undergraduate skill in the fine art of spying", with the performance of co-star Harrison being "the understatement of the new season. One suspected he was given a dose of Apathy." The Pittsburgh Post-Gazette commented that "Powers [is] somewhat of a timid UNCLE agent," that Harrison "gave evidence of stealing most of the credits," and that "the series is [...] only for UNCLE fans."

== Episodes ==
=== Backdoor pilot (1966) ===
The backdoor pilot, titled "The Moonglow Affair", originally aired as 52nd episode (S02E23) of The Man from U.N.C.L.E. on February 25, 1966.

Title	Directed by	Written by	Original release date
"The Moonglow Affair"	Joseph Sargent	Dean Hargrove	February 25, 1966
When Solo and Kuryakin are incapacitated, Waverly assigns agent April Dancer (Mary Ann Mobley) and Mark Slate (Norman Fell) to complete their mission.

=== Season 1 (1966–1967) ===
No.	Title	Directed by	Written by	Original release date	Prod. code
1	"The Dog-Gone Affair"	Barry Shear	Tony Barrett	September 13, 1966	8622
April Dancer is on her way to a Greek island with a dog whose fleas contain the antidote to a drug developed by Thrush. A man named Fromage sits next to April on the plane and, suspecting he is a Thrush agent, she contacts Mark and attaches a parachute to the dog, throwing it from the plane. Mark is captured briefly, but the dog escapes. Later, Mark and April meet and using a dog whistle April attracts the dog. However, it escapes again and when April gives chase, she is karate-chopped on the neck, faints and is kidnapped. When she revives, she is questioned by Zakinthios, who leads the mission for Thrush. Refusing to talk, April is quickly knocked out again. She wakes up tied to a swing over a pool of piranhas, but escapes in the nick of time, manages to retrieve the dog yet again, and Mark defeats Zakinthios in a fight. April and Mark eventually hand the dog over to the authorities to enable them to make the antidote.
2	"The Prisoner of Zalamar Affair"	Herschel Daugherty	Max Hodge	September 20, 1966	8611
Fatima, the daughter of the recently murdered Sheikh Ali Hassan, is the new ruler of Zalamar according to local law - but she has been kidnapped whilst Mark Slate was lucky not to eat the poisoned popcorn. Fatima happens to be an exact double of April Dancer who is sent to impersonate Fatima and to be crowned as ruler thereby ensuring that the oil fields do not fall under Thrush control. The Grand Vizier, who is next in line to the throne, determines that both princesses shall die. Slade attempts a rescue of the real sheikhess but fails. April gets to meet Fatima's intended husband, Calif Ahmed, whose continued presence thwarts the intention of the Grand Vizier. Mark is captured and secured adjacent to Fatima with both undergoing brainwashing whilst April is being prepared for Fatima's marriage. The initial rescue mission is also captured - but the lorry taking the captives to their final destination in the desert luckily fails to start. A diversionary fire enables the captives to be freed briefly until the Grand Vizier turns the tables again. The Calif's hand-to-hand combat skills disarm the Grand Vizier who escapes during the resultant meleé before being captured. A divorce is negotiated and the oil wells are safe.
3	"The Mother Muffin Affair"	Sherman Marks	Joseph Calvelli	September 27, 1966	8624
Somewhere in London and surrounded by Mother Muffin's (Boris Karloff) Murderous Men April Dancer and Napoleon Solo appear to be in trouble. April unwinds her knitwear to provide a long light pull which enables lights to come on and half of Mother Muffin's gang to use their machine guns to kill the other half. Thence to Brighton with an important ha'penny - except they are cornered by Mother Muffin who spends a good five minutes predicting their demise. April and Napoleon briefly escape but to absolutely no avail until a passing bus provides an escape route into a pig truck driven by Mother Muffin who deliberately engineers their escape to be able to follow them. A veritable merry-go-round ensues as the Muffin gang are slowly disabled and eventually they make their way back to HQ with their quarry.
4	"The Mata Hari Affair"	Joseph Sargent	Samuel A. Peeples	October 4, 1966	8617
Having boarded a train in France from a helicopter, April Dancer has found a courier when explosives are detonated wrecking the train and the courier, who is also an exotic belly dancer and about to play Mata Hari at a London theatre, dies. April decides to impersonate the dead belly dancer and to prove her credentials is required to demonstrate her abilities to the cast of the play which ends when there is a further murder attempt and then later disappears allowing Slade to chase through London in a left hand drive E Type Jaguar, which he loses when surrounded by a gang of floppy haired ne'er do wells whom he outwits and reclaims the car. April meanwhile has been tricked into the backstage area of the theatre becoming locked into a boiler room which then explodes. A masked figure links a statue of the god, Kali (which means death) to the power supply and at the end of her dance Miss Dancer theatrically "dies". However the cable had been found earlier and the team are able to unmask the masked man.
5	"The Montori Device Affair"	John Brahm	Boris Sobelman	October 11, 1966	8601
A raid on the U.N.C.L.E offices in Rome enables Thrush agents to remove a Montori device which leads Mr Waverley to instructing that all relay channels and communications may not be used until it is recovered. The device looks like a piece of jewellery and it is dropped through a letterbox where a child adds it to her necklace. The child is a daughter of Chu Chu who models for an Italian designer with an imminent private fashion show in Paris for Madame Freuchen-Nagy, whose husband the Count is organising an important conference of six world leaders. Using a mind control device the Thrush agents are able to separate the Count from his bodyguards and he reveals the location of the conference to be the Plit Hotel in Plit. Mr Slate has been captured by Thrush alerting April Dancer to potential problems, although she is soon captured by the Thrush agents. The children lead Mr Waverley to the suite where Mark Slate and April Dancer are being held and he is able, single handedly, to release them and save the world leaders from destruction.
6	"The Horns-of-the-Dilemma Affair"	John Brahm	Tony Barrett	October 18, 1966	8606
April Dancer arrives at a possible Thrush location in Mexico where she sees a man being held prisoner, the ranch being run by Alejandro DeSada. Risvold one of three men working on Project Gamma who have all disappeared recently. Risvold has had most of his memory wiped - the other two have suffered the same fate. However a fourth scientist is needed to complete all the knowledge of the project which once extracted the computer can convert to usable format. DeSada very quickly establishes April's identity as an agent. Almost magically April avoids death in a car crash. DeSada also empties the mind of the man who built the memory extracting computer. Elsewhere Mark Slade gets into a tight spot but manages to extricate himself. Waverley disguises himself as the fourth scientist and arrives in Mexico whilst April finds the cellar and the inmates. Slade and Waverley arrive at the ranch by helicopter and this scares DeSada into impaling himself on the horns of a dummy bull used for bullfighting training whilst the computer is destroyed and the scientists have all made comprehensive records so project gamma can be completed.
7	"The Danish Blue Affair"	Mitchell Leisen	Arthur Weingarten	October 25, 1966	8615
A Thrush agent kidnaps Stanley Umlaut (who was posing as a scientist) with knowledge of a particular a SPUD power circuit. The images of the circuit were embedded in a Danish Blue cheese which was regularly returned to the supplier. April and Mark head to Denmark and the source of the blue cheese to trace the route. Hidden behind the cheese shop front is an entire subterranean warren holding the SPUD machinery. April hitches a lift and finds Stanley but they both end up chained to a wall in the hidden tunnels. Mark Slade is ensnared by some disgruntled fishermen. April and Stanley are provided with an escape route but are soon being chased through a forest. They return to the tunnels and are re-captured. April has been secured on a buoy in direct line of fire from the SPUD machine before it reaches the ship Remus which is the demonstration target. Stanley is a serial impostor and convinces a guard to hand over his gun. He accesses a secondary control room and confuses the SPUD signal. The machinery then shorts out. April is rescued by the fishermen who also pick up Mark who now believe his story.
8	"The Garden of Evil Affair"	Jud Taylor	John O'Dea & Arthur Rowe	November 1, 1966	8607
The mad king Cambodyses is about to be regenerated in the persona of his only living female descendant, living in Berlin, using a serum which they manage to hijack. Members of the associated cult are fed poison from a very early date and can kill by scratching a person with their nails. Greta Wolff, the much sought future Queen, is currently an actress and this allows Thrush agents to chase Mark Slade through the studio backlot, including horses which are part of the western which is being filmed, plus a London bus, a rowing boat and bicycles. By impersonating Greta, April is taken by the cult to the tomb where she releases the king. Thrush appears in large numbers to observe the coronation following which the serum will be applied to the Queen. Mark and another agent extract April just before the injection and then detonate planted bombs which destroy the tomb and the Thrush agents as well as the cult members.
9	"The Atlantis Affair"	E. Darrell Hallenbeck	Richard Matheson	November 15, 1966	8609
On a Caribbean island Mark Slade is seeking information on Professor Antrim from a very nervous waitress. They find and board a boat, release the professor moments before the boat explodes coming under fire from pursuers as they attempt to row away to safety. The Professor believes that the crystals of Atlantis could, if powered by the sun, destroy the world. Mr Waverley instructs them to attempt to find Atlantis and they soon come under fire again leading to April Dancer and the local jeep driver, Vic Ryan, being captured by men in frock coats. The frock-coated men serve M Le Gallows who maintains a wish to live in the style of the eighteenth century and denies all knowledge of blasting which is taking place. April tells Mark that she does not trust the Frenchman - which is lucky as he pulls a gun on Mark to confirm her suspicions. They gain entrance to the mine where Vic falls into a river and is rescued by April and they are all soon captured. Having escaped April dances around with M Le Gallows in a sword fight and Colonel Faber seeks to escape with the crystals which catch the sunlight and blow up his boat, taking it all to the bottom.
10	"The Paradise Lost Affair"	Alf Kjellin	John O'Dea & Arthur Rowe	November 22, 1966	8621
In the South Pacific April Dancer is communications officer on a Thrush sailing ship which has been setting sonar beacons for use by cargo submarines. However they fail to take over the ship which blows up when a mutiny commences. She eventually crawls ashore on the island of Paradise which does not welcome trespassers. The local ruler Ghengis Gomes VIII imposes strict discipline on unwanted visitors - in April's case to become Liverpool Henry's wife. Mark objects to the marriage which means he has to fight the groom to the death. April eventually knocks out Liverpool Henry. However after the captain of the ship also arrives Henry joins April and Mark to make money from the charts but then changes sides again. April and Mark lure the Thrush agents onto the bridge over the hot lava and all fall into the lava swamp. Waverley is giving a speech about the missing agents when Mark calls in from Acapulco to report their shipwreck.
11	"The Lethal Eagle Affair"	John Brahm	Robert Hill	November 29, 1966	8626
In deepest Austria April Dancer appears to be in trouble strapped to the top of a car and an eagle is hovering overhead and then swoops onto the prey and is about to do serious damage when her captors shoot a molecular disruptor at the eagle which secures the bird in a cage (which April later finds has a false base) on the other side of the room. Thrush want a human demonstration of the machine. Mark hides in a piano in the chateau but escapes leaving behind his communicator. During the demonstration and much to the surprise of the inventor the machine appears to work - Mark vanishes as April cuts the power and Dieter appears in the cage. UNCLE and Thrush agents then appear and during the ensuing disorder the machine disappears itself.
12	"The Romany Lie Affair"	Richard C. Sarafian	Tony Barrett	December 6, 1966	8630
In the South of France a circus has attracted the attention of April Dancer who demonstrates her trapeze skills and is hired by Sadvaricci the owner (and King of the Romanies) who appears to have a sideline in stock market manipulation. Sadvaricci annoys his existing inamorata, Ponthea, who challenges April to combat much to the enjoyment of the other circus acts. April neatly disarms her rival who later drugs April locking her into the bear's cage. Trans European Steel is the next target when a major investor, Mrs Wainwright, is hypnotised and told to sell her shares by Sadvaricci's mother who allegedly tells fortunes. Both April and Mrs Wainwright are soon captives adjacent to the bear cage but April manages to release them both from their restraints. Outside in a fight Mark hits the circus owner who is mauled to death by the bear ending his criminal career.
13	"The Little John Doe Affair"	Leo Penn	Joseph Calvelli	December 13, 1966	8628
April Dancer has been following noted assassin Little John Doe and she is sent to Rome to protect a freelance mafia man, Joey Celeste, who is potentially the next victim. April's cover is that she is to record his memoirs and information about the syndicate in exchange for which he will be protected. A waiter delivers a bomb-laden roast chicken but April is able to disconnect the timing device. In the ensuing fight the waiter is killed and the police detain April and Joey who are getting along together very well - he calls her "Princess" throughout. Despite UNCLE HQ seeking their release the local police are far from rapid and when they are released they are still handcuffed together with Little John Doe in pursuit. He drives them away in a taxi and holds them at gunpoint inside the Colosseum. They attempt to negotiate and April's appeal wins Little John Doe over and they all walk away into the night alive with Joey hoping that eventually April will join him.
14	"The Jewels of Topango Affair"	John Brahm	Berne Giler	December 20, 1966	8614
Mark Slate finds that April Dancer has been replaced by Miss Brimstone, as confirmed by a fake Waverley soundalike. April is next seen with the real Waverley at the Egypt HQ and she is sent to Topango on Safari at a cost of $3000. Mark knows the son's ruler, Nicky, whose friendship prevents the normal death sentence for unauthorised visitors. To Mark's surprise Miss Brimstone accepts Nicky's proposal of marriage. April meanwhile is coming closer with the safari excursion. Mark makes contact with the real Mr Waverley who makes him aware that Miss Brinstome in a fake and only interested in the gems - but this is not true she really does love the King's son. Mark is being fed into a sausage making machine when the jewel thieves disguised as the safari party arrive. However Nicky can show them the diamonds and escape setting off explosives. Nicky gets to marry Miss Brimstone.
15	"The Faustus Affair"	Barry Shear	Jerry McNeely	December 27, 1966	8613
Professor Quantum has a machine which turns paper white over which Betram Elzie Bubb seems determined to gain control. April Dancer is appointed as Quantum's research assistant. Mark is sent to The Inferno nightclub where a blonde woman sends him down to the basement which he searches before the office door closes and locks him in, although April magically releases him in seconds. By the next day Bubb has funded a new research laboratory for Quantum in which he demonstrates that his equipment can remove all colour from everything turning every object white. Mark is unconscious and April and Quantum are soon held at gunpoint and thrust into the arctic research room from which they escape by rubbing two sticks together. A merry chase ensues through every type of weather possible. April ends up tuning on the machine which turns Bubb white. Following which Quantum terminates his infatuation with April.
16	"The U.F.O. Affair"	Barry Shear	Warren B. Duff	January 3, 1967	8623
Despite having the latest in well equipped car it is booby trapped and Salim ibn Hydari is able to kidnap April Dancer who is transported to North Africa. Prepared for the harem she is assisted by Nur, one of the wives, to escape into underground tunnels where she is soon recaptured. Hydari has a flying saucer which transports him to Italy and then having captured Mark Slate they return to North Africa. The flying saucer is being used to create panic. April is about to be dropped into boiling oil unless she reveals all of the UNCLE secrets but her captors are distracted and together with Mark gains "control" of the flying saucer. Hydari takes an early exit from the saucer with no parachute whilst April, Mark and Nur also exit and descend by parachute presumably safely.
17	"The Moulin Ruse Affair"	Barry Shear	Story by : Jay Simms; Teleplay by : Jay Simms & Fred Eggers	January 17, 1967	8610
Dr Vladimir Toulouse has invented a pill (vitamin Q) which enables the user to become incredibly strong - able to walk through walls, disarm agents, destroy steel bars and is only stopped by a gas held by April Dancer. There is a ransom of $5m if an army of such men is not to be let loose. However the aggressor also dies as a result of the pill. April takes a reduced strength pill to overcome the security and stays alive. On his island, Moulin. Dr Toulouse has a female army who are dosed up with the vitamin when the UNCLE agents arrive. The island also houses a health club populated by paying pensioners. April soon has her head stuck up through the floor in his pinball machine - where Mark soon joins her. They have to avoid being hit by a robot, each of which is a walking bomb. It turns out that the Dr's sidekick is a Thrush agent who stops the game and takes control. Toulouse loses his head in the pinball machine and the pensioners take lower strength pills and overwhelm the female army and secure the Thrush agent.
18	"The Catacomb and Dogma Affair"	E. Darrell Hallenbeck	Warren Duff	January 24, 1967	8629
In Venice April invites Mr Horsch onto the balcony and he descends into the water below from which Mark extricates him and we next see them on a train from which he escapes at the Yugoslavian border making his way to a well-guarded villa where she is drugged and admits she has a partner. It appears the "cardinal" is about to rob from the Vatican. There is a secret passage from the villa to the Vatican which will be used to access the Holy See. An unholy chase takes place through the tunnels after Mark has freed April both of whom have been helped by Adriana Raffaeli, an air hostess Mark had met previously. Taking the wrong door leads to them ending up in the water but their chasers have to depart as the police are about to arrive and then scramble back to safety where the fake cardinal appears and is arrested by the police. For once Mark sees more of Adriana at the end as they leave together.
19	"The Drublegratz Affair"	Mitchell Leisen	Boris Sobelman	January 31, 1967	8625
The ruler of Drublegratz, a Thrush controlled state has died and his heir Prince Nikolai suffers the ignominy of the bridge into the state leading to his death. As April Dancer has been identified as an UNCLE agent Dr Igor Gork, a notorious Thrush scientist, undertakes to remove the second nephew and April at the same time using the power of an avalanche from the nearby glacier. April, masquerading as a caged gogo dancer, is thrown off the mountain landing in water rather than on rocks and scrabbles ashore. Mark walks into a trap in Gork's control room and becomes part of the demonstration of Gork's machine which promptly fails to work correctly. During a fight the song "Bulgarian Baby" is amplified in reverse and the avalanche falls off the other side of the mountain on Dr Gork and avoids the palace completely, although April is not able to explain the events.
20	"The Fountain of Youth Affair"	E. Darrell Hallenbeck	Story by : Robert Bloch & Richard DeRoy; Teleplay by : Richard DeRoy	February 7, 1967	8605
April Dancer receives a phone call from Mrs Vechten who is concerned about Madame Dao but by the time they reach Mrs Vechten she has aged significantly and is dead. Sarah had discovered the Fountain of Youth which is a secret formula which the Baroness Blangsted is using to obtain state secrets. Following a run in with one of the assistants April is nearly drowned in a mud bath. In the case of Madame Dao her husband cancels the planned elections and her treatment may proceed. Later Mark ends up in a wild boar pen and is as dirty as April was earlier - as she reminds him. When Premier Dao arrives he has decided to reverse his decision to prevent a revolution. The UNCLE agents spirit the Daos off of the island on a submarine. The treatment also has a second formula which induces rapid ageing which the Baroness uses on Mark and then when the tables are turned April injects the Baroness.
21	"The Carpathian Caper Affair"	Barry Shear	Arthur Weingarten	February 14, 1967	8631
Somewhere in the Carpathians Magda is able to replace people with perfect replicas - so they could replace almost anyone of importance in the world. Mark Slade is almost apprehended breaking into Magda Manor. The tape he steals is encoded but contains details of the replacements Magda has already made of various world leaders who will become active agents when the tape is played in sync with the lunar orbiter signals. A newly married couple seem to have the replacement tape which the bride hides in her cleavage whilst the groom and Miss Dancer are captured and held in the hotel cellar. Once they escape from the cellar they commandeer a golf buggy with exploding golf balls being hit towards them, then incarcerated in a toaster until a bouncing ball ejects them. Mark and Mrs Shirley Fommer are being held in jail and are then abducted by agents led by a replacement Mr Waverley from whom they escape and are chased around the hotel until captured in the sauna leading Mark to observe that he has got out of worse situations than this before - a line used regularly. The bouncing ball returns to drop Mother Magda into her own soup.
22	"The Furnace Flats Affair"	Barry Shear	Archie Tegland	February 21, 1967	8603
Somewhere in the Old West April Dancer and Mark Slate are lost before finding a missing town where cowboys are staging a shoot out. Thrush are keen to acquire the land at Furnace Flats in Death Valley as it is a source of a crystal which can transform a laser into a death ray. The new owner is Packer Jo who sets up a competition between the UNCLE agents and Thrush agents. Whilst the girls compete out in the desert, Mark and Packer play Monopoly, dice and various other games. Thrush use a ground-to-ground missile to remove the only tree in the desert under which April Dancer was taking shade. The Thrush agents get their just deserts whilst the third contestant wins with the intention of rewilding the desert and Mark has to dig April out of the sand in which she has been buried.
23	"The Low Blue C Affair"	Barry Shear	Berne Giler	February 28, 1967	8632
Attending a funeral the corpse rises from the dead to murder the Duke and in the churchyard the murderer is also dispatched. The next in line for the Dukedom is Major Stella Irosian who leads a mission in London where a baby is left on the doorstep before exploding in the under-salted soup. April Dancer heads to Baroquo where she inveigles the gangster and next in line to invite her onto his yacht. However the second killer soon recognises her and she becomes a captive getting thrown overboard with the anchor. The succession is to be settled by a spin of the roulette wheel - and of course the challenger has remote control of the wheel. Luckily April Dancer is able to gain control of the wheel and it eventually ends up in noir and the Major wins the Dukedom leading to Mr Waverley playing the trombone in the marching army.
24	"The Petit Prix Affair"	Mitchell Leisen	Robert Hill	March 7, 1967	8634
An armoured truck will drive through a French village with $1m of cash on board whilst a go kart race is happening in the village to raise money for the local high school. However the mastermind of the plot has a non-working bomb which merely makes a mess. He is having an affair with local former member of the resistance, Desiree, who dreams of greater things. April gets kidnapped once and escapes, only to be dragged into a tent by the school dean who is the husband of the resistance woman who wants the robbery to be stopped. The mastermind, Plato, is the professor of a French civil service training academy and he uses the class to provide the numbers needed. The balloon lands and the stolen money is placed in the basket and April then turns on the burners and the balloon disappears into the sky. The go Karts are taken to be used in chasing the balloon. The dean and his wife win the Le Petit Prix. Being French only the Dean is confined, the others are merely to undergo psycho-therapy to solve their ills.
25	"The Phi Beta Killer Affair"	Barry Shear	Jackson Gillis	March 14, 1967	8619
Apparently a poker game is about to undermine the economics of entire world. Buddies Limited trains bodyguards for hire and Mark Slate is sent on a training course and it soon revealed that the trainers are working for Thrush. In a burlesque house April Dancer swaps with the entertainer who has a list of names for those participating in the poker game but reveals next to nothing. The Head of Buddies Limited has a grudge to settle with Mr Waverley and either kills or subverts the Thrush agents. Mark discovers that the bodyguards are being brainwashed into becoming killers of the person they are guarding and all players have a Buddies Ltd bodyguard. April is the poker game dealer. Mark gains entrance to the location far too easily. The players all start laughing and the bodyguards all fire - killing off all the bodyguards. The Head of Buddies Limited takes all of the stakes and descends to the cellar where madness ensues. It turns out the burlesque dancer knows Alexander Waverley.
26	"The Double-O-Nothing Affair"	John Brahm	Dean Hargrove	March 21, 1967	8638
Mark Slade has been working within Thrush and has scrambled recordings which he drops into a limousine where the driver is asleep; the driver promptly wakes and departs plus tape. The new "owner", Sydney Morehouse, advertises the availability of the tapes in the newspaper having buried them in the countryside. Thrush track April Dancer but she replants the homing device on a Thrush agent another set of agents kills them. Mark is able to talk himself into the local Thrush headquarters. However a child has erased the recordings as a joke. Inevitably Ms Dancer is apprehended and Mark Slate takes on the role of her interrogator. Morrell knocks out Slade, so is surprised when April insists on freeing him. Mark warns Thrush that he can detonate his watch remotely which they had taken and he has to do so as they refuse to accept his word having tried a similar trick earlier.
27	"The U.N.C.L.E. Samurai Affair"	Alf Kjellin	Tony Barrett	March 28, 1967	8636
In Hawaii a barbecue chef is murdered by a blow dart from the fire dancer before revealing his secrets to Mark Slade. A woman dressed in Japanese clothes, Sumata, ensures the fire dancer also meets his demise. Sumata is the sister of a Japanese war criminal who vanished. Investigating a boathouse on the Sumata estate Dancer and Slade are attacked by and then overpower a scuba diver, Barton who had provided charts of the harbour to Sumata. April Dancer enters the villa grounds and is soon apprehended, escapes and sneezes her way free again. Sumata intercepts FT626 - a US submarine on trial - with the intention of using it to access a casino vault. Mark releases the crew and the reclaim the submarine. Sumata has returned to her villa - to find April has disappeared. Sumata turns out to be her missing brother. Using the machine which nearly killed her earlier, April Dancer is able to kill the formerly missing Mr Mashai. Mr Waverley allows the two agents an extra night off.
28	"The High and the Deadly Affair"	Dick Bennett	Jameson Brewer	April 4, 1967	8620
A scientist, Dr Merek, releases an UNCLE agent into the wild with no memory. The scientist plans to release numerous infected songbirds across the world on behalf of Thrush to inflect death and destruction. Various people gather on a flight from London to Ankara and Dr Merek, travelling under another name, tampers with a chocolate eclair, secreting an explosive device. April Dancer is the least trained air hostess ever and Dr Merek jams all communication from the plane. Another scientist, Dr Hawkins, with a counter formula is travelling with her daughter and a doll (which contains the information being sought). Other passengers on the plane have their own agendas. April defuses the bomb and the entire plane lands safely. An entire episode and neither April or Mark were captive at any point.
29	"The Kooky Spook Affair"	Dick Bennett	John O'Dea & Arthur Rowe	April 11, 1967	8640
A detained UK Thrush agent promises that April Dancer will die at the hands of a top Thrush executioner (known as the man with a thousand faces). Following an unexpected attack in London Mark Slate has become the Lord of Maddington Manor, following the untimely deaths of all others in line for title, to where the agents decamp to hide out before the trial. Both April and Mark soon find their communicators have been stolen and their attempt to depart is foiled as the car no longer starts. Whilst a storm rages the phone line is cut, the power fails and a Slate impostor appears at the foot of April's bed. However someone is impersonating Mark's ancient ancestor, whilst the local Bobby is the current face of the executioner. The "ancestor" murders the butler and the next heir and then the replacement "butler" (who has 1000 faces) kills the mother of the heir before drinking the poisoned tea. The ancient ancestor turns out to be the last tenant of the estate, Heathcliff, who was hoping to inherit whilst the man with a 1000 faces seems to vanish - or has he become the ancient ancestor?

== Syndication ==
Beginning in 1968, reruns of all 29 episodes of The Girl from U.N.C.L.E., including 99 of 105 of its parent series, The Man from U.N.C.L.E., were combined into a 128-episode syndication package in the United States. Years later, a few more episodes were added to the package, rounding it out to 132.

== Home media ==
On August 23, 2011, Warner Bros. released the complete series in two parts on DVD in Region 1 via their Warner Archive Collection. The two 4-disc collections contain all 29 episodes of the series. These are Manufacture-on-Demand (MOD) releases, available exclusively through Warner's online store and only in the United States.

== Soundtrack ==
Jerry Goldsmith's theme for The Man from U.N.C.L.E. was adapted for the series by Dave Grusin in an energetic variation. Of the 29 episodes, eight had complete original scores and six were partial scores, with the rest being tracked by the previously written material.

Grusin wrote four complete scores ("The Dog-Gone Affair", "The Mother Muffin Affair", "The Mata Hari Affair" and "The Furnace Flats Affair"), Richard Shores — who would be the principal composer for The Man from U.N.C.L.E the following season — wrote three ("The Montori Device Affair," "The Prisoner of Zalamar Affair" and "The Danish Blue Affair") and Jack Marshall composed his only score for either U.N.C.L.E. series with "The Horns-of-the-Dilemma Affair". Jeff Alexander, also writing his only U.N.C.L.E. music, provided a partial score for "The Garden of Evil Affair", sharing "Music Score by" credit with Grusin and Shores, the latter two sharing the credit on all the other episodes, tracked and partial score alike. The opening and closing title themes and suites from the episodes "The Dog-Gone Affair", "The Prisoner of Zalamar Affair", "The Mother Muffin Affair", "The Mata Hari Affair", "The Montori Device Affair" and "The Horns-of-the-Dilemma Affair" are included on the third FSM album of music from The Man from U.N.C.L.E.

== Original novels ==
First Girl from U.N.C.L.E. novel. Pictured: Stefanie Powers as April Dancer. Note misspelling of Powers' first name.

The Girl from U.N.C.L.E. was featured in five original novels, only two of which were published in the United States:

- The Birds of a Feather Affair by Michael Avallone
- The Blazing Affair by Michael Avallone
- The Global Globules Affair – Simon Latter (published in United Kingdom, and in France as L'affaire des Globules)
- The Golden Boats of Taradata Affair – Simon Latter (published in United Kingdom only)
- The Cornish Pixie Affair – Peter Leslie (published in United Kingdom only)

Unlike the series, the novels were quite serious, with the plot of The Birds of a Feather Affair ending in tragedy for April when the "innocent" character usually featured in the TV show dies, despite what April does to stop the villains. In addition, the prohibition on April using deadly force on the TV series (described earlier) did not apply to the novels.

A The Girl from U.N.C.L.E. Annual was published for three issues in the UK, which included novellas not published elsewhere. Gold Key Comics published a short-lived, five-issue comic book.
