= Roger Smith (actor) =

American actor, film producer and screenwriter (1932–2017)

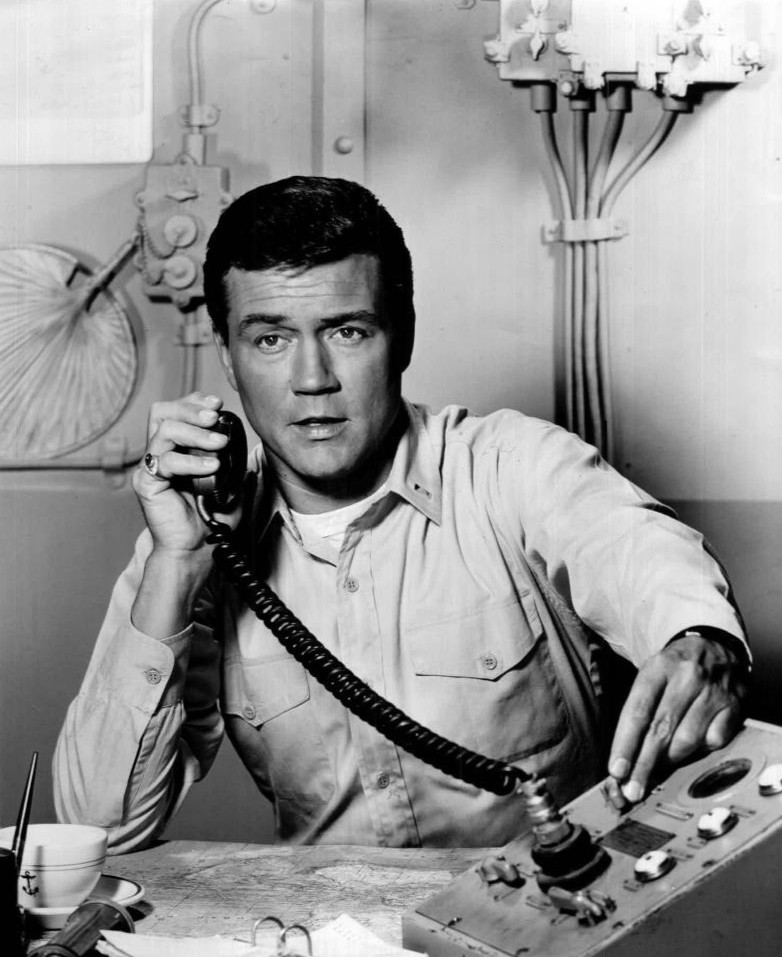
- Smith as Mister Roberts (1967)
- Born: Roger LaVerne Smith; December 18, 1932; South Gate, California, U.S.
- Died: June 4, 2017 (aged 84); Los Angeles, California, U.S.
- Education: University of Arizona
- Occupations: Actor; producer; screenwriter
- Years active: 1956–1977
- Spouses: Victoria Shaw (m. 1956; div. 1965) Ann-Margret (m. 1967)
- Children: 3

Roger LaVerne Smith (December 18, 1932 – June 4, 2017) was an American television and film actor, producer, and screenwriter. He starred in the television detective series 77 Sunset Strip and in the comedy series Mister Roberts. Smith went on to manage the career of Ann-Margret, his wife of 50 years.

== Early life ==
Smith was born in South Gate, California, the son of Leone Irene (née Adams) and Dallas LaVerne Smith. When he was six, his parents enrolled him into a stage school, where he took singing, dancing, and elocution lessons. He grew up in Nogales, Arizona, where his family moved when he was 12. He was educated at the University of Arizona at Tucson on a football scholarship. He won several amateur talent prizes as a singer and guitarist.

== Career ==
Smith served with the Naval Reserve and was stationed in Hawaii with the Fleet All-Weather Training Unit-Pacific, a flight-training unit near Honolulu. After a chance meeting with actor James Cagney, he was encouraged to try a career in Hollywood. (Cagney had also encouraged other young actors for whom he found roles in two 1956 films.) He later played Cagney's character's son, Lon Chaney Jr. in Man of a Thousand Faces.

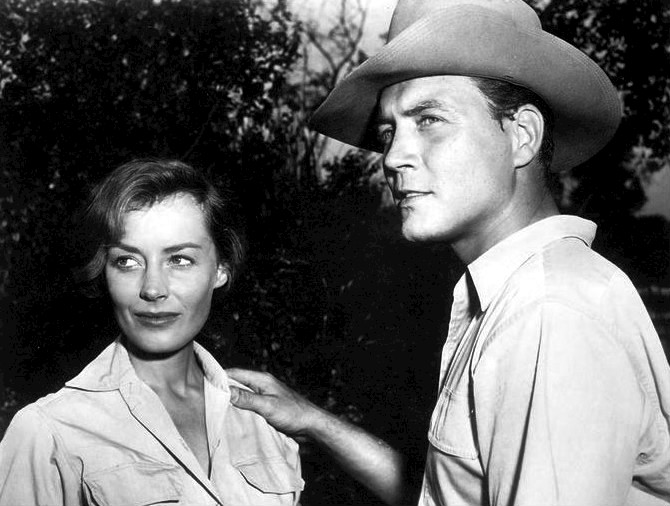
With first wife Victoria Shaw

Smith signed with Columbia Pictures in 1957 and made several films, then moved to Warner Bros. in 1958. On April 16, 1958, Smith appeared with Charles Bickford in "The Daniel Barrister Story" on NBC's Wagon Train. His greatest film exposure was the role of the adult Patrick Dennis in Auntie Mame, with Rosalind Russell.

His signature television role was private detective Jeff Spencer in 77 Sunset Strip. Smith appeared in 74 episodes of the Warner Bros. Television series. Due to his popularity on the show, Warner Bros. Records released one LP album by Smith titled, Beach Romance on Warner Bros. Records WS 1305, in June 1959. He left the popular ABC program in 1962 because of a blood clot in his brain. He recovered from this after surgery.

Before he obtained a role in another television series, Smith said he had to "fight my way back from a point where I had almost decided to give up acting." He then starred as Lt. Douglas Roberts in the Warner Bros. Television series Mister Roberts, a comedy-drama series on NBC-TV in 1965–1966.

He produced two films with Allan Carr, The First Time (1969) and C.C. and Company (1970), which he also wrote.

His health declined, and in 1980, according to wife Ann-Margret, he was diagnosed with myasthenia gravis, a neuromuscular disease.

His condition went into remission in 1985. Following his retirement from performing, he managed his wife's career and produced her popular Las Vegas stage shows. In an interview with the New York Post, Ann-Margret said that he had Parkinson's disease. He appeared rarely on television after his health deteriorated, although he participated on This Is Your Life, when host Ralph Edwards devoted an episode to Ann-Margret. In addition to the appearances credited below, Smith appeared on several game shows.

== Personal life ==
Smith married twice. His first wife (1956–1965) was Australian-born actress Victoria Shaw with whom he had three children: daughter Tracey (b. 1957) and sons Jordan (b. 1958) and Dallas (b. 1961). Smith and Shaw divorced in 1965.

He married Ann-Margret on May 8, 1967. He became her manager, but he retired largely due to myasthenia gravis.

== Death ==
Smith died at age 84 on June 4, 2017, at Sherman Oaks Hospital in Sherman Oaks, Los Angeles, of complications from myasthenia gravis. He is interred in the Forest Lawn Memorial Park (Hollywood Hills).

== Filmography ==
=== Film ===
- Over-Exposed (1956) — Reporter (uncredited)
- Man of a Thousand Faces (1957) — Creighton Chaney at 21
- Operation Mad Ball (1957) — Cpl. Berryman
- No Time to Be Young (1957) — Bob Miller
- Crash Landing (1958) — John Smithback
- Auntie Mame (1958) — Patrick Dennis (older)
- Never Steal Anything Small (1959) — Dan Cabot
- For Those Who Think Young (1964) — Detective (uncredited)
- Sette uomini e un cervello (1968) — Un giocatore
- Rogues' Gallery (1968) — John Rogue (final film role)

=== Television ===
- The Original Amateur Hour (1948) — as a singer and guitarist with Ted Mack
- Damon Runyon Theater (1956, Episode: "Hot Oil") — Richard
- Celebrity Playhouse (1956, Episode: "Faith") — Eddie Mason
- Ford Theatre (1956) — Skee Langford / Jug Jensen / Carter
- Father Knows Best (1956–1958) — Doyle Hobbs
- Sheriff of Cochise (1957, Episode: "The Kidnapper") — Jim
- West Point (1957, Episode: "M-24")
- The George Sanders Mystery Theater (1957, Episode: "Round Trip")
- Wagon Train (1958, Episode: "The Daniel Barrister Story") — Dr. Peter Culver
- Sugarfoot (1958, Episode: "Yampa Crossing") — Gene Blair
- 77 Sunset Strip (1958–1963) — Jeff Spencer
- Hawaiian Eye (1960, Episode: "I Wed Three Wives") — Jeff Spencer
- The Ford Show, Starring Tennessee Ernie Ford (December 22, 1960) — Himself
- Surfside 6 (1962, Episode: "Love Song for a Deadly Redhead") — Jeff Spencer
- Kraft Suspense Theatre (1964, Episode: "Knight's Gambit") — Anthony Griswold Knight
- Mister Roberts (1965 Series) — Lt. Douglas Roberts
- Hullabaloo (1966)
