= Roy Rhodes =

US Army soldier and spy (1917–1997)

Roy Adair Rhodes
- Born: March 11, 1917; Oilton, Oklahoma
- Died: February 5, 1997 (aged 79); Pueblo, Colorado
- Occupation: Soldier
- Criminal charge: Espionage
- Spouse: Ola Gertrude Rhodes
- Espionage activity
- Allegiance: Soviet Union
- Codename: Quebec
- Operations: Soviet Cold War spy (1952–1957)

Roy Adair Rhodes (codenamed "Quebec") was a Master Sergeant in the United States Army Signal Corps and was infamous for being blackmailed by the KGB into supplying information to the Soviet Union.

== Biography ==
Rhodes was born on 11 March 1917 in Oilton, Oklahoma.

While working in the United States Embassy in Moscow, Rhodes became intoxicated and slept with a Soviet agent whom he was later told was pregnant. The KGB threatened to tell this to Rhodes's wife if he failed to cooperate with them. From 1952 to 1957, the KGB used him to obtain information from the National Security Agency and other important United States agencies even after leaving his post in Moscow in 1953. Rhodes was caught during the Hollow Nickel Case when information on him was found on a KGB-authored microfilm. He was court-martialled, found guilty of conspiracy to commit espionage, dishonorably discharged, and sentenced to five years' hard labor.

Rhodes died on 5 February 1997 in Pueblo, Colorado at 79 years old.
