= George Ives (actor) =

American actor (1926–2013)

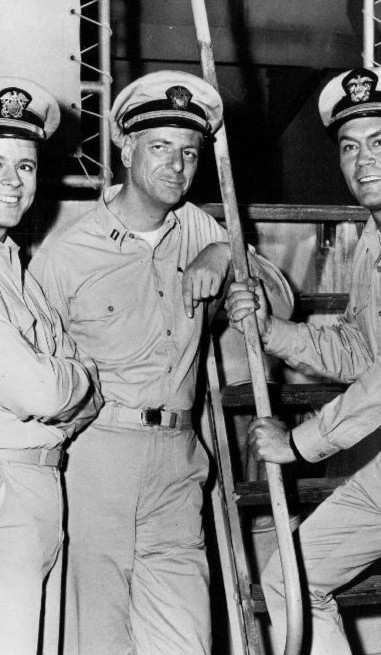
- Ives in Mister Roberts (1967)
- Born: January 19, 1926; New York City, U.S.
- Died: February 22, 2013 (aged 87); Brentwood, Los Angeles, California, U.S.
- Occupation: Actor
- Years active: 1950–2007

George Ives (January 19, 1926 – February 22, 2013) was an American character actor.

== Career ==
A native of New York City, Ives played Douglas Aldrich in the television series The Jim Backus Show, also known as Hot off the Wire. Ives gained cult popularity when he appeared in a satirical mock-intro on the DVD edition of The Big Lebowski. He starred in an episode of The King of Queens, an episode of The Andy Griffith Show entitled TV or Not TV, as well as an episode of The Office entitled "Phyllis' Wedding.” Ives also appeared as Lank Dailey, owner of Dailey's Motel and the Arena roadhouse in Hot Rods to Hell, the last film directed by John Brahm.

== Personal life ==
He died at his home in Brentwood, Los Angeles, California, in 2013 at the age of 87.

== Filmography ==
=== Film ===
Year	Title	Role	Notes
1953	Niagara	Carillon Tower Guide	Uncredited
1966	Hot Rods to Hell	Lank Dailey	
1967	The Ballad of Josie	Freemont	Uncredited
1968	The Secret War of Harry Frigg	Major	
1972	Get to Know Your Rabbit	Mr. Morris	
2001	The Man Who Wasn't There	Lloyd Garroway	
2003	Intolerable Cruelty	Mrs. Gutman's Lawyer	

=== Television ===
Year	Title	Role	Notes
1951, 1952	Studio One	Dick Herbert / Mr. Robinson	2 episodes
1953–1956	The United States Steel Hour	Various roles	3 episodes
1960	Bachelor Father	Arthur Daniels	Episode: "Bentley, the Stage Mother"
1960	The Donna Reed Show	John Coutts	Episode: "Donna Decorates"
1961	The Many Loves of Dobie Gillis	Mr. Huggins	Episode: "What's My Lion?"
1961	Peter Gunn	Arthur Holland	Episode: "Jacoby's Vacation"
1961	Shirley Temple's Storybook	The Apothecary	Episode: "The Terrible Clockman"
1961	The DuPont Show with June Allyson	The Colonel	Episode: "The School of the Soldier"
1961	The Jim Backus Show	Douglas Aldrich	Episode: "The Woman's Touch"
1961–1962	The Hathaways	Bert Brockwood / George Brockwood	4 episodes
1961–1962	The Law and Mr. Jones	Hiller / Harwood	2 episodes
1961, 1962	Perry Mason	Police Board Chairman / Lt. Gregg	2 episodes
1963	My Three Sons	Larry Travers	Episode: "The Dream Book"
1963	The Eleventh Hour	The Manager	Episode: "Everybody Knows You Left Me"
1963, 1965	Mr. Novak	Mr. Ingram / Dr. Loomis	2 episodes
1964	The Lieutenant	Hotel Manager	Episode: "Between Music and Laughter"
1964	The Farmer's Daughter	Willingham	Episode: "The Swinger"
1964, 1965	Wendy and Me	Dr. Rawlins / Norman Robinson	2 episodes
1965	No Time for Sergeants	Dr. Stone	Episode: "A Hatful of Muscles"
1965	The Andy Griffith Show	Allen Harvey	Episode: "TV or Not TV"
1965	Mister Ed	Mr. Pettigrew	Episode: "Ed's Diction Teacher"
1965–1966	Mister Roberts	Doc	30 episodes
1965–1968	Bewitched	Various roles	3 episodes
1966	Please Don't Eat the Daisies	Mickey	Episode: "My Mother's Name Is Fred"
1967	Run for Your Life	Eddling	Episode: "The Calculus of Chaos"
1967	Petticoat Junction	Rod Grander	Episode: "The Fishing Derby"
1967	Get Smart	Dr. Bascomb	Episode: "Witness for the Persecution"
1967–1971	Green Acres	Various roles	5 episodes
1969	Judd, for the Defense	Dr. Nelson Kornbluth	Episode: "The Law and Order Blues: Part 2"
1970	It Takes a Thief	Crane Belson	Episode: "The Suzie Simone Caper"
1971	Room 222	Howard Bruckner	2 episodes
1971	That Girl	Dawson	Episode: "That Shoplifter"
1971	The Mod Squad	Manager	Episode: "The Poisoned Mind"
1971	The D.A.	Judge	Episode: "The People vs. Swammerdam"
1971	O'Hara, U.S. Treasury	Clifford Spry	Episode: "Operation: Crystal Springs"
1972	The Sixth Sense	Frank Young	Episode: "Gallows in the Wind"
1972, 1973	Emergency!	School Principal / Party Guest	2 episodes
1974	Happy Days	Mr. McKay	Episode: "Hardware Jungle"
1974	Get Christie Love!	Butler	Episode: "Pawn Ticket for Murder"
1975	Adam-12	George Dubow	Episode: "Citizen with a Gun"
1975	Mannix	Hallihan	Episode: "Design for Dying"
1977	Wonder Woman	Samuels	Episode: "The Return of Wonder Woman"
2001	The King of Queens	Man in Limo	2 episodes
2007	The Office	Uncle Al	Episode: "Phyllis' Wedding"
