= List of satirical news websites =

This is a list of notable satirical news websites which have a satirical bent, are parodies of news, or consist of fake news stories for mainly humorous purposes. For magazines published on paper, see List of satirical magazines.

== Definition ==
The best-known example is The Onion, the online version of which started in 1996. News satire is a type of parody presented in a format typical of mainstream journalism, but instead contains satirical content. It is popular on the web, where it is relatively easy to mimic a credible news source and stories may achieve wide distribution from nearly any site.

These sites are not to be confused with fake news websites, which deliberately publish hoaxes in an attempt to profit from gullible readers.

== List ==
List of satirical news websites
Name	Domain	Country	Founded
Al-Hudood	alhudood.net	Jordan	2013
ASZdziennik	aszdziennik.pl	Poland	2011
Awaze Tribune	awazetribune.com	Eritrea	2016
The Babylon Bee	babylonbee.com	United States	2016
The Beaverton	thebeaverton.com	Canada	2010
The Betoota Advocate	betootaadvocate.com	Australia	2014
Bopress	bopress.ma	Morocco	2016
Borowitz Report	borowitzreport.com	United States	2001
The Burrard Street Journal	burrardstreetjournal.com	Canada	2015
The Chaser	chaser.com.au	Australia	1999
El Chigüire Bipolar	elchiguirebipolar.net	Venezuela	2008
The Civilian	thecivilian.co.nz	New Zealand	2013
ClickHole	clickhole.com	United States	2014
Cracked	cracked.com	United States	2007
Christwire	christwire.org	United States	2008
The Daily Bonnet	dailybonnet.com	Canada	2016
The Daily Bonnet	ungerreview.com	Canada	2016
The Daily Mash	thedailymash.co.uk	United Kingdom	2007
The Daily Squib	dailysquib.co.uk	United Kingdom	2007
The Daily WTF	thedailywtf.com	United States	2004
Deník To	denik.to	Czech Republic	2023
El Deforma	eldeforma.com	Mexico	2010
Duffel Blog	duffelblog.com	United States	2012
The eXile	exiledonline.com	Russia	1998
El Koshary Today	elkoshary.com	Egypt	2008
The Fauxy	thefauxy.com	India	2018
Fognews	fognews.ru	Russia	2012
The Framley Examiner	framleyexaminer.com	United Kingdom	2001
Hard Drive	hard-drive.net	United States	2017
The Hard Times	thehardtimes.net	United States	2014
Humor Times	humortimes.com	United States	1991
Huzlers	huzlers.com	United States	2014
Islamica News	islamicanews.com	United States	1999
Internet Chronicle	chronicle.su	United States	
Khabaristan Times	khabaristantimes.com	Pakistan	2014
Kyoko Shimbun	kyoko-np.net	Japan	2004
Landover Baptist Church	landoverbaptist.org	United States	1998
Le Gorafi	legorafi.fr	France	2012
Lark News	larknews.com	United States	2003
The Lemon Press	thelemonpress.co.uk	United Kingdom	2009
Lercio	lercio.it	Italy	2012
El Mundo Today	elmundotoday.com	Spain	2009
National Report	nationalreport.net	United States	2013
NewsBiscuit	newsbiscuit.com	United Kingdom	2006
NewsThump	newsthump.com	United Kingdom	2009
Nieuwspaal	nieuwspaal.nl	Netherlands	2015
Njuz.net	njuz.net	Serbia	2010
Nordpresse	nordpresse.be	Belgium	2014
The Onion	theonion.com	United States	1996
The Oxymoron	theoxymoron.co.uk	United Kingdom	2007
The Poke	thepoke.com	United Kingdom	2002
Panorama	panorama.pub	Russia	2017
Der Postillon	der-postillon.com	Germany	2008
Private Eye	private-eye.co.uk	United Kingdom	1997 (Note: Private Eye in printed magazine format existed before the website, and was founded in 1961.)
Reductress	reductress.com	United States	2013
The Rochdale Herald	rochdaleherald.co.uk	United Kingdom	2016
SatireWire	satirewire.com	United States	2010
ScrappleFace	scrappleface.com	United States	2002
Sensacionalista	sensacionalista.com.br	Brazil	2009
Sovetskaya Belorussiya	t.me/s/sovbelarussia	Belarus	2019
De Speld	speld.nl	Netherlands	2007
Die Tagespresse	dietagespresse.com	Austria	2013
Topeka News	topekasnews.com	United States	2008
Toons Mag	toonsmag.com	Norway	2009
The True North Times	truenorthtimes.ca	Canada	2014
Timesnewroman.ro	timesnewroman.ro	Romania	2009
The UnReal Times	theunrealtimes.com	India	2011
Walking Eagle News	walkingeaglenews.com	Canada	2017
Waterford Whispers News	waterfordwhispersnews.com	Ireland	2009
Weekly World News	weeklyworldnews.com	United States	2009
World News Daily Report	worldnewsdailyreport.com	Canada	2013
Zaytung	zaytung.com	Turkey	2010

== Defunct ==
- Adequacy
- Bbspot
- The Daily Currant
- The DailyER
- Faking News
- Southend News Network
- Le Journal de Mourréal

== See also ==
Satirical news:

- News satire
- List of satirists and satires
- List of satirical magazines
- List of satirical television news programs

Related topics:

- Confirmation bias
- Court of public opinion
- Filter bubble
- Selective exposure theory
- Sensationalism
- Spiral of silence
- Trial by media
