= List of satirical fake news websites =

The following is a list of satirical websites that have been created by companies or individuals and contain content that has been described by fact-checkers, journalists or researchers as fake news.

== List ==
Even though many satirical sources are labeled as such with disclaimers, there is a long history of satirical content being falsely perceived as true. According to Snopes, this misunderstanding can be due to a variety of reasons:

- A lack of understanding of literary techniques typically used for satire, such as sarcasm, irony and exaggeration
- Satirical content being shown out of context in e-mails, memes and social media posts
- Satirical content not being seen in full
- Different satirical techniques appealing to different audiences
- Different readers having different frames of reference
- Some readers not expecting to see satirical content.

The following table lists websites considered by fact-checkers to be satire:

Name	Domain	Status	Notes	Sources
8Shit	8shit.net			
Abril Uno	abriluno.com		Responsible for the Marlboro M hoax.	
actualidadpanamericana.com	actualidadpanamericana.com		Parody/satire site, per PolitiFact.	
Associated Media Coverage	AssociatedMediaCoverage.com		Spread hoaxes since February 2016, including the false claim of a late-night motorcycle curfew.	
Baltimore Gazette	baltimoregazette.com		Unrelated to Baltimore Gazette, a 19th-century newspaper. Possibly part of same network as Associated Media Coverage, another fake news site.	
Blog.VeteranTV.net	Blog.VeteranTV.net		Per PolitiFact.	
Boston Leader	bostonleader.com		Possibly part of same network as Associated Media Coverage, another fake news site. Part of the same network as Batty Post.	
The Boston Tribune	thebostontribune.com		Starting in February 2016, this website spread outright hoaxes. Possibly part of same network as Associated Media Coverage, another fake news site.	
Business Standard News	bizstandardnews.com	Defunct	Its stories have been mistaken as real-news then shared and cited as real-news. A disclaimer says the stories "could be true" because "reality is so strange nowadays". But the disclaimer also says it is "a satirical site designed to parody the 24-hour news cycle." Its name is similar to the unrelated Indian English-language daily newspaper called Business Standard.	
Call the Cops	callthecops.net			
DailySnark.com	DailySnark.com		Parody/satire site, per PolitiFact.	
Duffelblog.com	Duffelblog.com		Parody/satire site, per PolitiFact.	
El Mundo Today	elmundotoday.com			
Empire News	empirenews.net		Many of this website's fake news hoaxes were widely shared on social media, with stories based on social or political controversies, or were simply appalling to readers. The site says that its content is for "entertainment purposes only."	
Florida Sun Post	floridasunpost.com		Possibly part of same network as Boston Leader. Part of the same network as Batty Post.	
FreeWoodPost.com	FreeWoodPost.com		Parody/satire site, per PolitiFact.	
HalfwayPost.com	HalfwayPost.com		Parody/satire site, per PolitiFact.	
Hay Noticia	haynoticia.es			
heaviermetal.net	heaviermetal.net		Satire about heavy metal music.	
NationalReport.net	NationalReport.net		Founder Jestin Coler told Columbia Journalism Review: "When it comes to the fake stuff, you really want it to be red meat. [...] It doesn't have to be offensive. It doesn't have to be outrageous. It doesn't have to be anything other than just giving them what they already wanted to hear." In 2013, the nonpartisan FactCheck.org deemed NationalReport.net a satirical site. The site's disclaimer states "All news articles contained within National Report are fiction, and presumably fake news. Any resemblance to the truth is purely coincidental."	
Nevada County Scooper (NC Scooper)	ncscooper.com		Satire site, per Snopes. False claims that the US federal government planned to confiscate weapons had spread on social media.	
News Feed Observer	NewsFeedObserver.com		Parody/satire, per FactCheck.org.	
The Lapine	thelapine.ca			
The Onion	theonion.com	Active	American digital media company and newspaper organization that publishes satirical articles on international, national, and local news. Its articles cover real and fictional current events, parodying the tone and format of traditional news organizations with stories, editorials, and street interviews using a traditional news website layout.	
The People's Cube	ThePeoplesCube.com		Parody/satire site, per PolitiFact.	
The Postillon	the-postillon.com		Parody/satire, per FactCheck.org and PolitiFact.	
Real News Right Now	Realnewsrightnow.com		Parody/satire site, per FactCheck.org and PolitiFact.	
TheRealShtick.com	TheRealShtick.com		Parody/satire site, per PolitiFact.	
There Is News	thereisnews.com			
Satira Tribune	satiratribune.com		Satire site, per Snopes. False claims that Jimmy Carter had cured his cancer via medical marijuana had spread on social media.	
Seattle Tribune	theseattletribune.com		Possibly part of same network as Associated Media Coverage, another fake news site.	
Southend News Network	southendnewsnetwork.net		Local satire site for Southend, England. Some hoaxes have been mistaken by some local residents as true. Recognized by the Southend-on-Sea City Council as an "official media outlet" despite its satire to further community engagement.	
The Spoof	thespoof.com			
Straight Stoned	straightstoned.com		Hosted on the same webserver as Action News 3.	
U OK Hun	uokhun.uk		Has the same AdSense ID as Southend News Network.	
The Valley Report	thevalleyreport.com		Created by a comedian to publish satire and hoaxes.	
World News Daily Report	worldnewsdailyreport.com		Run by Janick Murray-Hall. Its disclaimer states, "World News Daily Report assumes all responsibility for the satirical nature of its articles and for the fictional nature of their content. All characters appearing in the articles in this website—even those based on real people—are entirely fictional and any resemblance between them and any person, living, dead or undead, is purely a miracle."	

=== The Last Line of Defense ===
Name	Domain	Status	Notes	Sources
America's Last Line of Defense	Americaslastlineofdefense.org		Part of same network as The Last Line of Defense.	
As American as Apple Pie	AsAmericanAsApplePie.org		Falsely claimed that Alec Baldwin was arrested for threatening President Trump. Parody/satire site, per FactCheck.org, PolitiFact and Snopes. Part of same network as The Last Line of Defense.	
BeBest.website	bebest.website		Part of same network as The Last Line of Defense.	
BustATroll	bustatroll.org		Part of same network as The Last Line of Defense.	
Conservative Tears	conservativetears.com		Part of same network as The Last Line of Defense.	
coolinfo24.com	coolinfo24.com		Part of same network as The Last Line of Defense.	
Daily World Update	dailyworldupdate.com		Part of same network as The Last Line of Defense.	
Daily World Update	dailyworldupdate.us		Part of same network as The Last Line of Defense.	
Dildo the Donald	dildothedonald.us	Defunct		
The Dunning-Kruger Times	dunning-kruger-times.com		Part of same network as The Last Line of Defense.	
Freedom Crossroads	Freedomcrossroads.us		Parody/satire, per FactCheck.org and PolitiFact. Part of the same network as The Last Line of Defense.	
Freedum Junkshun	FreedumJunkshun.com		Part of the same network as The Last Line of Defense.	
ladiesofliberty.net	ladiesofliberty.net		Part of the same network as The Last Line of Defense.	
The Last Line of Defense	thelastlineofdefense.org		This website has a history of publishing fake news articles, especially of the political genre. Notable hoaxes include Donald Trump revoking the press credentials of six major news outlets, Michelle Obama getting ditched by the Secret Service, and Hillary Clinton describing Beyoncé's music using racial slurs. Although the website claims to be written by "a group of educated, God-fearing Christian conservative patriots who are tired of Obama's tyrannical reign and ready to see a strong Republican take the White House," its articles are in fact all written by one person, Christopher Blair, who has written under multiple pen names. As of 2019, Blair's site is now branded as "Daily World Update: satire for flat-Earthers, Trumpsters and Y'all-Qaeda."	
The Last Line of Defense (thelastlineofdefense.online)	thelastlineofdefense.online		Part of same network as The Last Line of Defense.	
No Fake News Online	nofakenews.online		Part of same network as The Last Line of Defense.	
nofakenewsonline.us	nofakenewsonline.us		Part of same network as The Last Line of Defense.	
notmypot.us	notmypot.us		Part of same network as The Last Line of Defense.	
Nunadisbereel.com	Nunadisbereel.com		Parody/satire site, per PolitiFact. Part of same network as The Last Line of Defense.	
ObamaWatcher	obamawatcher.com		Part of same network as The Last Line of Defense.	
Our Land of the Free	Ourlandofthefree.com		Parody/satire, per FactCheck.org and PolitiFact. Part of same network as The Last Line of Defense.	
potatriotpost.com	potatriotpost.com		Part of same network as The Last Line of Defense.	
PotatriotsUnite.com	PotatriotsUnite.com			
Re-state.us	Re-state.us		Part of same network as The Last Line of Defense. Spoof of DeadState.	
Reagan Was Right	reaganwasright.com		Part of same network as The Last Line of Defense.	
Sdopes	sdopes.com		Part of same network as The Last Line of Defense. Spoof of Snopes.	
TatersGonnaTate	tatersgonnatate.com		Part of same network as The Last Line of Defense.	
Tater Report	taterreport.com		Part of same network as The Last Line of Defense.	
TrumpBetrayed.us	trumpbetrayed.us		Part of same network as The Last Line of Defense.	
trumpscrewed.us	trumpscrewed.us		Part of same network as The Last Line of Defense.	
wearethellod.com	wearethellod.com		Part of same network as The Last Line of Defense.	
Worstpot.us	worstpot.us		Part of same network as The Last Line of Defense.	

=== Newslo ===
Name	Domain	Status	Notes	Sources
Newslo	newslo.com		Parody/satire, per FactCheck.org and PolitiFact.	
Politicalo.com	Politicalo.com		Parody/satire site, per PolitiFact. Part of Newslo network.	
Politicass.com	Politicass.com		Parody/satire site, per PolitiFact.	
Politicono.com	Politicono.com		Parody/satire site, per PolitiFact. Part of Newslo network.	
Politicops	politicops.com		Parody/satire, per FactCheck.org and PolitiFact. Part of Newslo network.	
Politicot	politicot.com		Parody/satire, per FactCheck.org and PolitiFact. Part of Newslo network.	
Religionlo.com	Religionlo.com		Parody/satire site, per PolitiFact. Part of Newslo network.	
The Rightists	Therightists.com		Parody/satire, per FactCheck.org and PolitiFact. Part of Newslo network.	

=== Deceptive satire ===
Some websites self-labeled as satire have been accused by journalists from news outlets such as Politico and The New Republic of duplicity by means of clickbait headlines, humorless appeals to partisans, hidden disclaimers, and oversaturation of ads.

Name	Domain	Status	Notes	Sources
Big America News	bigamericannews.com			
cartelpress.com	cartelpress.com		Has the same owner as Huzlers.	
Christwire	christwire.org			
Civic Tribune	CivicTribune.com		Impostor site, per PolitiFact	
CreamBMP	creambmp.com			
The Daily Currant	dailycurrant.com			
dailyfinesser.com	dailyfinesser.com		Has the same owner as Huzlers.	
daily-inquirer.com	daily-inquirer.com		Part of the same network as The South East Journal.	
the-daily-star.com	the-daily-star.com		Part of the same network as The South East Journal.	
the-dailystar.com	the-dailystar.com		Part of the same network as The South East Journal.	
Demyx	demyx.com			
The Dorset Eye	dorseteye.com		Claimed itself as satire after a false claim it published about Boris Johnson went viral.	
Empire Sports	empiresports.co		Includes a disclaimer describing itself as a "satirical and entertainment website". Not to be confused with the legitimate (but long-defunct) Empire Sports Network.	
Global Associated News	globalassociatednews.com		Described itself as enabling users to produce fake stories using its "fake celebrity news engine". Also known as Media Fetcher.	
Huzlers	huzlers.com		Fake news from this website often involves restaurants and leading brands to disgust readers with its gross-out stories. One story by the site falsely reported that Dong Nguyen, the creator of Flappy Bird, killed himself. Another story made up an incident where a person working at a McDonald's restaurant put his mixtapes in Happy Meals. The site describes itself as "the most infamous fauxtire & satire entertainment website in the world."	
The Lightly Braised Turnip	lightlybraisedturnip.com			
Media Fetcher	MediaFetcher.com		Parent website for Global Associated News.	
Mediamass	mediamass.net			
The Miami Gazette	TheMiamiGazette.com		Impostor site, per PolitiFact. Webpage includes a hidden disclaimer that claims itself as satire.	
Modern Woman Digest	modernwomandigest.com		Shares a writer with Civic Tribune and National Report.	
NewsBuzzDaily	newsbuzzdaily.com	Defunct	This fake news website mostly consists of celebrity gossip and death hoaxes, but a few of its other stories were disseminated on social media. When the site was up it said that it was "a combination of real shocking news and satire news" and that articles were for "entertainment and satirical purposes" only.	
News Hound	news-hound.org			
The News Nerd	thenewsnerd.com	Defunct	A defunct website which used to have a disclaimer on every page.	
The No Chill	thenochill.com		Contains a disclaimer at the bottom of the page. As of 2017, part of Revcontent, an ad network commonly used by fake news websites.	
Not Allowed To	NotAllowedTo.com		Per PolitiFact. Copied story from World News Daily Report. Has hidden disclaimer.	
Real Raw News	realrawnews.com		A WordPress site hosting conspiratorial content, often about public figures being tried and executed for supposed crimes. According to PolitiFact, "The website's "About Us" page features a disclaimer saying it contains "humor, parody and satire," but the author has repeatedly defended his stories as truth."	
satirenewsdaily.com	satirenewsdaily.com		Part of the same network as The South East Journal.	
ScrapeTV	scrapetv.com		Per BuzzFeed News.	
south-eastjournal.com	south-eastjournal.com		Part of the same network as The South East Journal.	
The South East Journal	the-southeast-journal.com			
The Stately Harold	thestatelyharold.com		Webpage includes a hidden disclaimer that claims itself as satire.	
Stuppid	Stuppid.com			
Underground News Report	UndergroundNewsReport.com		According to PolitiFact, "the site purposely writes outlandish stories to trick readers". Launched on February 21, 2017, the website gained more than 1 million page views in its first two weeks; after two weeks, admitted that all posts are false; in less than a month the site was sued by Whoopi Goldberg. Added a disclaimer at the bottom of the page. Was approved for running ads on Content.ad network. Spread its articles to Pro-Trump groups on Facebook.	
Viral Cords	Viralcords.com		Per FactCheck.org. Does not contain a disclaimer, and its owner information is hidden.	
That Viral Feed	ThatViralFeed.net		Per PolitiFact. Posted a joke story that was only fully apparent when reading it to the end. Republished a story from Empire Herald. Published a false story with an out-of-context image.	
weeklyinquirer.com	weeklyinquirer.com		Part of the same network as The South East Journal.	
WIT Science	witscience.org			
