= Lercio =

Italian news satire website

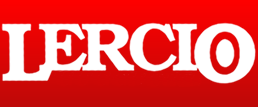

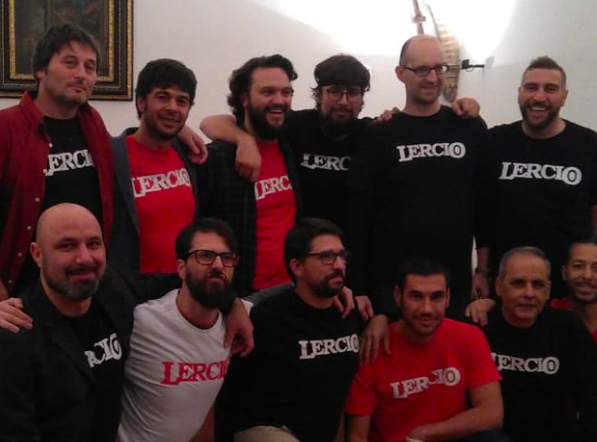
- Part of Lercio's editorial team in 2018
- Website type: News satire
- Available in: Italian
- Creator: Michele Incollu
- Website: www.lercio.it
- Commercial: No
- Launched: October 2012; 13 years ago
- Current status: Online

Lercio (Italian for 'Filthy', pronounced [ˈlertʃo] or [ˈlɛrtʃo]) is an Italian site of news satire providing humorous and grotesque articles, headlines, polls and other columns to satirize the tone and format of sensationalistic press, in the style of The Onion.

== History ==
The site, founded by Michele Incollu as a parody of the free press website Leggo (from which it takes the font of the logo and the similar-sounding name), published its first article on October 28, 2012. Lercio is edited by a satirical group that started writing punchlines at La Palestra, a school of comedy writing on the website of the Italian popular comedian Daniele Luttazzi, then founded Acido Lattico and finally joined the editorial staff of Lercio.

On September 13, 2014, Lercio became known to the general public by winning Best Italian Website and Best Joke categories at the Macchianera Internet Awards.

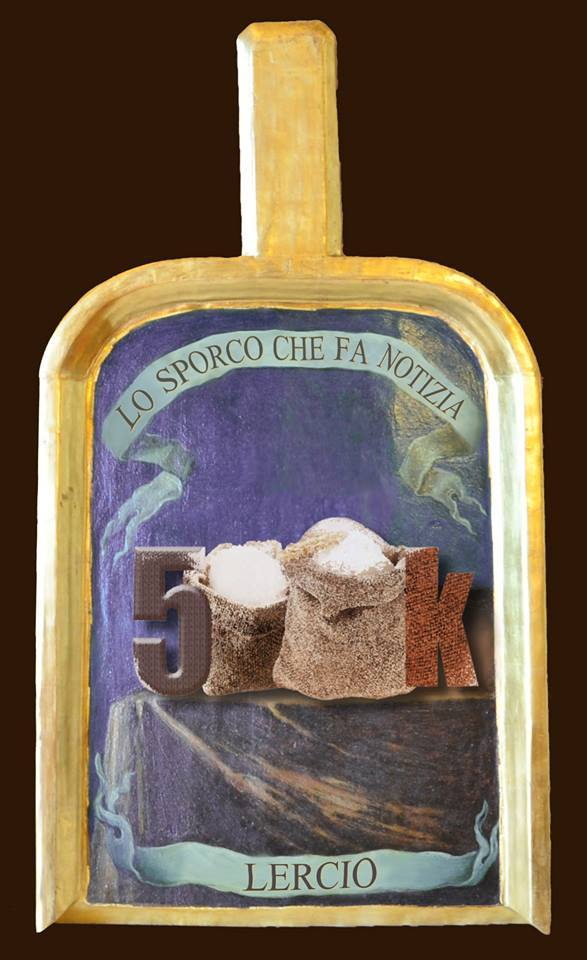
The shovel that Accademia della Crusca in Florence dedicated to Lercio

In November 2014, Lercio released its first book Un anno Lercio, published by Rizzoli and with a fake preface by Orson Welles. In 2015, the renowned Accademia della Crusca in Florence, targeted by the collective in numerous articles, dedicated to Lercio one of its famous shovels. On April 13, 2017, Lercio released its second book, Lo sporco che fa notizia, published by Shockdom with a preface by Daniele Luttazzi and a cartoons introduction by Sio. In August 2017, Lercio performed two shows at the 25th edition of the Sziget Festival in Budapest.

Since 2018, Lercio has been collaborating with famous satirical sites from all over Europe, such as Der Postillon (Germany), Le Gorafi (France) and El Mundo Today (Spain), exchanging and translating articles. In November 2018, two authors from the collective went to Ethiopia for a reportage to promoting a development project under the aegis of the international NGO AMREF. On December 6, 2018, with a preface by Giobbe Covatta and cover and internal drawings by Sara Pichelli, Lercio released its third book La storia lercia del mondo, again by Shockdom, composed almost exclusively of unpublished pieces.

From January 28, 2019, Best of Lercio, a selection of the best articles published in the past year, became available in the Audible library. In June 2020, Lercio.it occupied 7th position in the ranking of Italian media interactions on social networking sites.

In July 2020, the website of the Treccani encyclopedia published an analysis about Lercio's metalinguistic satire. On July 28, 2020, Lercio released its first quiz book, Vero o Lercio? Lo sporco che non ti aspetti, published by Rizzoli.

The editorial staff of Lercio is often requested in institutes and universities, (e.g. CNR) to talk about the relationships between satire and fake news, and has taken part in important festivals throughout Italy, including Cortona Mix Festival, Parole O_Stili, Prix Italia, Parole in Cammino, Futura Festival, Web Marketing Festival, Social Media Strategies, Perugia International Journalism Festival, Pisa Internet Festival and Lucca Comics & Games.

== Television ==
From 2017 to 2018, TG Lercio "news" videos were broadcast on television by DMAX.

On November 21, 2019, TG Lercio made its debut on the RAI TV show Gli stati generali, hosted by Serena Dandini on Rai 3.

== Awards ==
2014
- Macchianera Italian Awards (categories: Best Website and Best Joke)

2015
- Macchianera Italian Awards (categories: Best Website, Satire and Humor Website, and Best Joke)
- Forte dei Marmi Political Satire Award (category: Web)

2016
- Carnival of Viareggio – Satire Award
- Macchianera Italian Awards (categories: Best Website, Satire and Humor Website, and Best Joke)

2017
- Web Marketing Festival (category: Digital Journalism)
- Macchianera Italian Awards (categories: Best Website, Satire and Humor Website, and Best Joke)

2018
- Macchianera Italian Awards (categories: Best Satire and Humor Website, and Best Joke)

2019
- "Massimo Troisi" Award for Best Comical Writing
- "Gabriele Galantara" Satire & Caricature International Award
- Macchianera Italian Awards (categories: Best Website, Satire and Humor Website, and Best Joke)
- Biennale dell'Umorismo di Tolentino (Accademia Social Award)

2020
- Bagheria ComBag Award 2020 for Communication

2021
- Magna Grecia Awards

2022
- Carnival of Viareggio – "Gianfranco Funari" Prize Il giornalaio dell'anno

== Bibliography ==
- Un anno Lercio: il 2014 come non l'avete mai letto. Rizzoli. 2014. ISBN 8817079081.
- Lercio. Lo sporco che fa notizia. Il libro. Shockdom. 2017. ISBN 8893360594.
- Lercio. La storia lercia del mondo. I retroscena dell'umanità. Shockdom. 2018. ISBN 8893361310.
- Vero o Lercio? Lo sporco che non ti aspetti. Bur Rizzoli. 2020. ISBN 9788817148368.
- Mock'n'Troll. People. 2021. ISBN 9791280105530.
- Lercio. Cerco amico scemo a cui regalare questo libro. Il peggior libro da colorare mai esistito. Fabbri. 2021. ISBN 8891584347.
- 70 grandi rompicazzo della storia (71 con te). People. 2024. ISBN 9791259792495.

== See also ==
- News satire
- List of satirical news websites
