= Christwire =

Satirical website

- Screenshot
- Website type: Satirical blog
- Available in: English
- Commercial: No
- Registration: Optional
- Current status: Inactive

Christwire was a satirical website that published blog-style articles intended to ridicule excesses of American Christian conservatives. Recurring topics include homosexuality, atheism, Hollywood, and other purported threats to American culture.

Like similar satirical websites, Christwire's stories have sometimes been erroneously taken at face value. According to co-founder Kirwin Watson, their target is not Christians but "those who do not question what they hear on the news".

== Topekas News ==
Due to the wide public attention at the name Christwire, the site also runs topekasnews.com.

One satirical news article by "Haywood Bynum III" pronounced that "Edible Marijuana Candies Kill 9 in Colorado, 12 at Coachella." The Drug Abuse Resistance Education anti-drug organization copied the article onto their website without fact checking the satirical article.

== See also ==
- Adequacy.org
- Landover Baptist Church
- Poe's law
- List of satirical magazines
- List of satirical news websites
- List of satirical television news programs
