= The Oxymoron =

Satirical magazine of Oxford University

- Type: Termly satirical news magazine
- Format: Magazine
- Owner(s): student-run
- Founded: 2007
- Circulation: 2,500
- Website: theoxymoron.co.uk

The Oxymoron is a student satirical magazine published anonymously by and for students of Oxford University. It takes the form of a spoof newspaper, similar to The Onion, though with a focus on events relevant to the life of an Oxford student. The magazine takes its name from the concept of an oxymoron, as well as being a reference to the word Oxon, used to identify an Oxford degree. It is published termly.

== History ==
The magazine was founded in Michaelmas term of 2007 by Matt Pickles, David Murgia and John Citron, three undergraduate students from The Queen's College, and first published on November 17. Each issue from the second has been 8 pages in length; the first contained 4 pages. These are split between news satire, and spoof features. In contrast with the majority of student publications, it is printed without the names of the writers or editors, and these are not normally made public. Many previous Oxymoron editors have gone on to work as professional journalists and comedy writers.

== Awards ==
Year	Awards	Nomination	Result	Winner
2008	Guardian Student Media Awards	Best Magazine	Nominated	Quench, University of Cardiff
2009	Guardian Student Media Awards	Best Magazine	Winner	Won
2010	Guardian Student Media Awards	Digital Journalist of the Year (Mimi Kempton Stewart)	Runner-up	Will Benton, King's College London

== See also ==
- List of satirical magazines
- List of satirical news websites
- List of satirical television news programs
