= Squib (writing) =

Brief satirical or witty piece of writing or speech

A squib is a brief satirical or witty piece of writing or speech, like a lampoon, or a short, sometimes humorous piece in a newspaper or magazine, used as a filler. It can be intended to ignite thinking and discourse by others on topics of theoretical importance, but is often less substantial than this and just humorous (see The Daily Squib).

One of the most famous squibs in English literature is The Candidate by Thomas Gray.

In linguistics, the term "squib" is used for a very short scholarly article; this usage in the field was popularized by John R. “Haj” Ross in the 1960s. A squib may outline anomalous data but not suggest a solution, or develop a minor theoretical argument. A particularly interesting variety of squibs is the so-called snippets, which are "the ideal footnote: a side remark that taken on its own is not worth lengthy development but that needs to be said". The online journal Snippets is dedicated to this type of squib.

== See also ==
- Pasquino, a statue in Rome where anonymous short satires are deposited
