= The Daily WTF =

Humorous blog

- Website type: Software engineering disaster blog
- Creator: Alex Papadimoulis
- Website: thedailywtf.com
- Registration: optional
- Launched: 17 May 2004; 22 years ago
- Current status: active

The Daily WTF (also called Worse Than Failure from February to December 2007) is a humorous blog dedicated to "Curious Perversions in Information Technology". The blog, run by Alex Papadimoulis, "offers living examples of code that invites the exclamation ‘WTF!?'" (What The Fuck!?) and "recounts tales of disastrous development, from project management gone spectacularly bad to inexplicable coding choices."

In addition to horror stories, The Daily WTF "serve[s] as [a] repositor[y] of knowledge and discussion forums for inquisitive web designers and developers" and has introduced several anti-patterns, including Softcoding, the Inner-Platform Effect, and IHBLRIA (Invented Here But Let's Reinvent It Anyway).

The site also has an associated "Édition Française", a French-language edition headed up by Jocelyn Demoy, launched in March 2008, as well as a Polish edition.

== History ==
The website was started on 17 May 2004, when Papadimoulis posted an entry entitled "Your Daily Cup of WTF" on his blog as a means of simply complaining about the quality of development at his then current employer. On his third such post, a reader of his blog suggested that he start a new website dedicated exclusively to such humorous "bad code" postings. A few days later, he registered TheDailyWTF.com domain name and began posting stories from readers of the site.

The content of the site kept evolving, and the body of articles was split into several columns. On 2 November 2006 Papadimoulis starting running code samples as articles entitled the "Code Snippets of the Day", "CodeSOD" for short. Originally edited by Tim Gallagher, the column was taken over by Derrick Pallas (now the sole editor of CodeSOD) as well as Devin Moore and Mike Nuss on 2 January 2007. On 12 February 2007 Jake Vinson started a new column, "Error'd", based on the old monthly series "Pop-Up Potpourri".

The site was renamed to "Worse Than Failure" on 24 February 2007 because "'Daily' and 'What The F*' didn’t quite describe it anymore". Papadimoulis also did not enjoy explaining the meaning "WTF" to people unfamiliar to the phrase, as it contains profanity. This was not without controversy, and some readers threatened to stop reading the site because of this. The change was reverted on December 12, 2007, after a short and tongue-in-cheek stint as "The Daily Worse Than Failure".

== Olympiad of Misguided Geeks ==
Olympiad of Misguided Geeks at Worse Than Failure (abbr. OMGWTF) was a programming contest to "solve an incredibly simple problem using the most obscenely convoluted way imaginable". It was started by Alex Papadimoulis because he wanted "to try out something new on [the] site." Contestants for the OMGWTF contest were encouraged to focus on writing "clever code" (code which is unconventional and solves a problem that may or may not be solvable with conventional means) as opposed to "ugly code" (single letter variable names, no subroutines, and so on).

The goal of the first (and so far, only) contest was to "implement the logic for a four-function calculator." It ran from 24 April 2007 to 14 May 2007 and received over 350 submissions which were then judged by popular technology bloggers Raymond Chen, Jeremy Zawodny and Joel Spolsky.

The winning entry was Stephen Oberholtzer's "Buggy 4-Function Calculator", which, according to judge Joel Spolsky "best exemplifies what real-world code looks like ... [it's] not just bad code, [it's] believable bad code." In addition to "a High-Resolution JPEG of an Official Olympiad of Misguided Geeks at Worse Than Failure First Prize Trophy," the winner received a 15-inch MacBook Pro.

== Notable guest appearances ==
In addition to the mostly anonymous stories, several prominent figures have written stories they’ve encountered in their professional experience, such as Blake Ross who wrote of the failure of Netscape 7.

== See also ==
- List of satirical magazines
- List of satirical news websites
- List of satirical television news programs
