= The Tab =

Youth news site published by Tab Media Ltd.

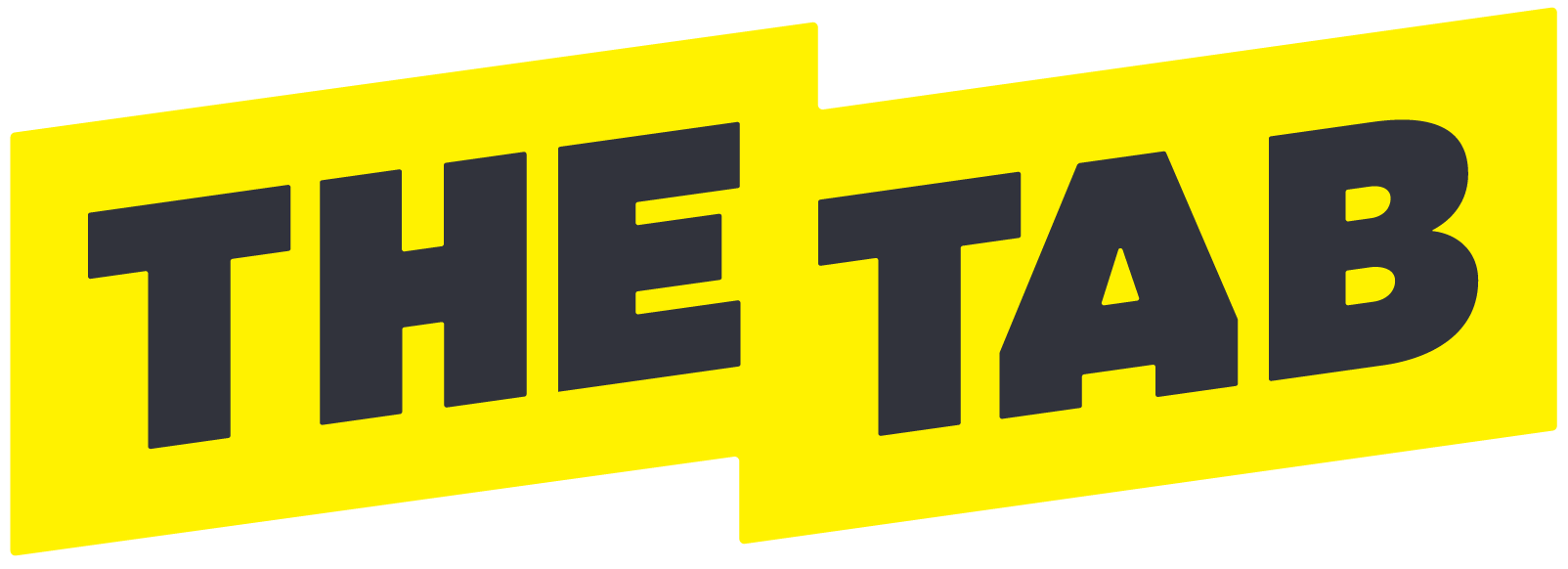
- Type: News site
- Format: Online
- Owner: Digitalbox Plc
- Founder(s): George Marangos-Gilks, Jack Rivlin, Taymoor Atighetchi
- Editor: Grace Vielma
- Founded: June 2009; 17 years ago
- Headquarters: London, England, United Kingdom
- Website: thetab.com

The Tab is a youth news and entertainment site, published by Digitalbox Plc.

It was launched at the University of Cambridge and has since expanded to over 20 universities in the United Kingdom. Now it is better known as a voice-driven pop culture brand for Gen-Z and 18-34s.

The name originates from both an abbreviation for tabloid and a nickname applied to Cambridge students (from "Cantabs'").

The Tab's network consists of a global site and an individual sub-site for each university. The global site covers a wide range of topics, such as pop culture, news, lifestyle, trends, mental health, politics, and gaming.

Local campus-based stories are produced by students, with a student editorial team for each sub-site. Professional editors in The Tab's offices in Shoreditch and Williamsburg offer guidance and editorial insight to their student teams, as well as writing for the site on a regular basis.

In September 2017, News Corp was the main investor with a total of $6m (£4.6m) of new funding raised by Tab Media. In return for its investment, News Corp took a minority stake in it and Emma Tucker, deputy editor of The Times, sat on its board of directors. Digitalbox, who had also been the owner of satirical website The Daily Mash, bought out The Tab in 2020.

== History ==
=== 2009–2012 ===
The Tab was launched in 2009 by Cambridge students Jack Rivlin, George Marangos-Gilks and Taymoor Atighetchi. The website was marketed as "Cambridge University's Online Tabloid" promising to "provide fast news and entertainment direct to your rooms". The Tab was initially funded entirely by its three founders, although it now funds itself through advertising and other investment. At its inception, "Tab Totty", a Page 3-esque feature, featured photographs of scantily clad Cambridge University (male and female) students in provocative poses. The feature was widely criticised, and Cambridge University's Women's Officer stated, "We can do better as a university". The subsequent controversy was picked up by several mainstream British newspapers, and made international headlines.

In 2009, the site's readers voted British National Party leader Nick Griffin "The worst person ever to attend Cambridge University", with 44% of the vote. In early 2010, The Tab ran an April Fools' Day hoax claiming Griffin had been stripped of his degree. This was subsequently reported by The Sun who believed the claims to be genuine. In November 2010, The Tab released documents obtained via the Freedom of Information Act detailing recent disciplinary procedures enacted across the university. Details from the documents released were then reported by national newspapers, including The Daily Telegraph. In June 2011, The Tab published a pilot print edition of 5,000 copies in May Week and another Freshers' Week edition in October 2011. This tradition continued in the following years.

=== 2012–2015 ===
Rivlin and Marangos-Gilks, joined by Tristan Barclay, received backing from external investors after winning a Downing Enterprise competition, enabling them to move to running The Tab full time and to launch it nationally. With this national launch, in autumn 2012, The Tab established editions at Durham, Exeter, UEA, and UCL. The news site has held journalism training events in association with The Daily Telegraph.

=== 2015–2018 ===
The Tab opened its first American bureau in Brooklyn in July 2015. The Tab's first scoop to make the national papers came four days before it launched its first sub-site – a video of a UVA hockey player chugging a beer on the ice which they broke on their Facebook page made The Washington Post, USA Today and several other titles. The site launched at 23 colleges on the East Coast in the fall of 2015 – including Ivy League institutions, and major public universities such as Penn State, University of North Carolina, and Rutgers. They broke several stories which made the American national press. Their coverage of a Dartmouth Black Lives Matter protest was featured on Fox News and quoted in The Washington Post. In April 2016, The Tab broke the news of where President Obama's daughter Malia was attending college.

In August 2016, founder Jack Rivlin assumed the role of CEO and Joshi Herrmann, a former Tab Cambridge editor who had been working at the Evening Standard, was appointed as Editor in Chief. Grace Vielma became UK Editor. They have since expanded their team at their London office to 33 people. In September 2017 News Corp was the main investor of a total of $6m (£4.6m) of new funding raised by Tab Media. In return for its investment News Corp took a minority stake in it and Emma Tucker, deputy editor of The Times, sat on its board of directors.

=== 2018–present ===
In 2018, Grace Vielma was named Editor-in-Chief and in October 2020 Digitalbox plc acquired Tab Media and The Tab.

In 2024, The Tab redesigned and relaunched its site to reflect a new era of global entertainment coverage. In 2025, The Tab has an audience of millions in the UK and US, with a focus on trending pop culture. The site's core audience is 18-34s, with a Gen-Z and female focus. Reality Shrine, The Tab's spin-off site covering US reality TV, was launched in February 2025.

== Babe ==
Babe, also known as Babe.net, was a spinoff aimed at young women. It was established in May 2016 by then Tab editor Roisin Lanigan and focuses on what Slate contributor Ruth Graham called "vulgar tomfoolery" – provocative, light stories unlikely to appeal to older women.

In January 2018, a woman using the pseudonym 'Grace' wrote an article on Babe accusing comedian Aziz Ansari of sexual misconduct. The article was met with a polarized and mixed response among commentators and the public with disagreement as to whether the incident described in the Babe article constitutes sexual misconduct, and to whether the accuser's narrative trivialized or damaged the Me Too movement. The journalist who edited the story at Babe.net, Katie Way, was criticized by HLN anchor Ashleigh Banfield. Banfield had previously criticized Ansari's anonymous accuser, drawing Way's ire in an email response which she read in-part on-air, characterizing it as hypocritical. The email included Way claiming "Ashleigh [was] someone who I am certain nobody under the age of 45 has ever heard of" and describing her as a "burgundy-lipstick, bad-highlights, second-wave-feminist has-been." Responding to criticism of the site's choice to publish the account, Tab editor-in-chief Joshi Herrmann said it was "patently ridiculous" to ignore stories solely because they did not involve illegal behavior.

It was reported in early 2019 that Babe CEO Jack Rivlin was looking to sell the site. Babe closed in February 2019.

== Scoops and notable stories ==
Notable scoops for The Tab include Malia Obama's decision to go to Harvard University, and the publication of the memes that got 12 incoming freshmen kicked out of Harvard. In December 2012, the Bristol title revealed a ban on female speakers at the university's Christian Union. Starting in September 2013, The Tab pioneered a campaign that got student unions across the UK to ban Robin Thicke's song "Blurred Lines", after Edinburgh University Students' Association boycotted it. Later in the year, the site published an exclusive story after DJ Tim Westwood was caught unleashing a torrent of sexist jibes at Leicester's Student Union.

In February 2016, The Tab's Reading edition interviewed Amber-May Ellis, a student at the University of Reading and a reality TV star, who got a tattoo of homeless Ian Beale on her thigh. In under 24 hours, the story had gone viral; it was picked up by all of the UK's tabloid newspapers, as well as by ITV's This Morning. A week in 2014 The Tab dubbed "The week The Tab dominated Fleet Street". In February 2017, The Tab Cambridge reported a story about a student member of the Cambridge University Conservative Association burning a £20 note in front of a homeless person. The story was covered by The Guardian, as well as by The Daily Telegraph.

In 2017, The Tab launched its annual Mental Health Rankings, the first of its kind, where universities are ranked according to their spend per student on mental health support.

In 2018, The Tab published a long-read investigation into the death of Emily Drouet, a student who died by suicide. Through extensive interviews with her mother and friends, the piece highlighted the issue of domestic abuse affecting young women in their first relationships.

In 2021, The Tab's investigation into Diary of a CEO and Dragons' Den star Steven Bartlett's company Social Chain revealed allegations of bullying and a toxic working environment.

=== False scoops and April Fools' Day hoaxes ===
In April 2010, an April Fools' Day story alleging that Cambridge had stripped Nick Griffin of his degree was picked up by The Sun. On April Fools' Day 2014, a Cambridge story alleged that Prince William had received a third class degree.

== Controversies ==
In October 2016, a group of University of Nottingham students dressed as a rollercoaster were reported by The Tab to be impersonating The Smiler rollercoaster crash of June 2015. This article was picked up by the national press including the BBC, ITV, and Metro. The Tab reporter, Joseph Archer, admitted to the Daily Mail that he had "not spoken to the group to ask what their costume was about" as the bar they were in was "very busy", a statement that the group of students said was wrong. The Tab later issued an apology for their story and admitted that they had "messed up".

Student writers, including local student editors, are unpaid. This has led to criticism from other journalists as well as accusations The Tab is exploiting its writers. When The Tab's women's vertical babe was first launched in May 2016, the majority of its writers were unpaid work experience students taking part in The Tab's summer 2016 Fellowship Scheme. In 2017, Babe recruited more unpaid contributors in both the US and UK, as part of their Summer Correspondents program. Applicants were told that despite being unpaid they would receive many benefits, including: "Getting your stories read by thousands of readers across the world". Babe established a small team of staff writers and editors at its Brooklyn office before ending in 2019.

In October 2024, The Tab Edinburgh was accused of classism and spreading Anti-Scottish sentiment after a number of TikTok comments from their social media account contained messages against Scottish students following comments on the lack of Scottish students portrayed in their videos. The channel temporarily turned off comments and made itself private, but never made a statement on the issue.
