= NewsThump =

British news satire website

- Website type: Satire
- Website: newsthump.com
- Commercial: Yes
- Launched: 2009
- Current status: Active

NewsThump is a British news satire website that publishes spoof articles about current events. It is similar to other British news satire sites such as The Daily Mash.

== History ==
The site was started in 2009 by Richard Smith, a comedy writer. It had grown to receive around 100,000 hits a day by 2011-12. In a 2016 Reddit AMA, Smith said that the site was receiving 2 million views per month.

Asked about how writing satire had changed online since he began NewsThump in 2009, Smith told The Big Issue that, "Ten years ago, something would happen in the news and we would spend a few hours going through it, knock around a few ideas and maybe publish something on the website. Now if something happens and someone thinks of a good joke, it is a race to get it online." In 2017, he said, "People perceive satire to be quite cynical, but people go onto our sites to be entertained."

== Content ==
The site's articles are presented as genuine news stories, with frequent use of fake quotes, which editor Richard Smith has suggested are intended to mimic the BBC News website. In 2016, he was quoted as saying that "if someone shares one of our stories believing it to be true, then we would see that as both amusing, but also a failure on our part" but claimed that he was not worried by a clamp-down on "fake news" by social media companies. In 2017, however, he complained that their articles had been hit by Facebook's implementation of a "fake news" filter.

NewsThump content has sometimes been mistaken for real news. In 2015, the right-wing British National Party mistakenly believed a NewsThump article claiming Labour Party leader Jeremy Corbyn had implemented a "hug a jihadi" policy within his party was factual. A spoof story about British Prime Minister Theresa May cancelling a general election was mistaken for real news and debunked by Snopes as was a story on NewsThump that a BBC weather presenter had described the weather as "Cold as F*ck".

In 2017, the site provided financial support for the charity Reading Family Aid, who had to cancel a Christmas Toys and Teens appeal for local children after a lack of funds.

In a paper for the 2018 Internet, Policy & Politics Conference, Chamil Rathnayake of the University of Strathclyde characterised NewsThump and its peers as "a distinct layer of post-truth new media".

In February 2026 TikTok formally banned and deleted the NewsThump account after a review. The account appeared to have fallen foul of the algorithmic content review system used by TikTok.

== See also ==
- List of satirical news websites
