= El Koshary Today =

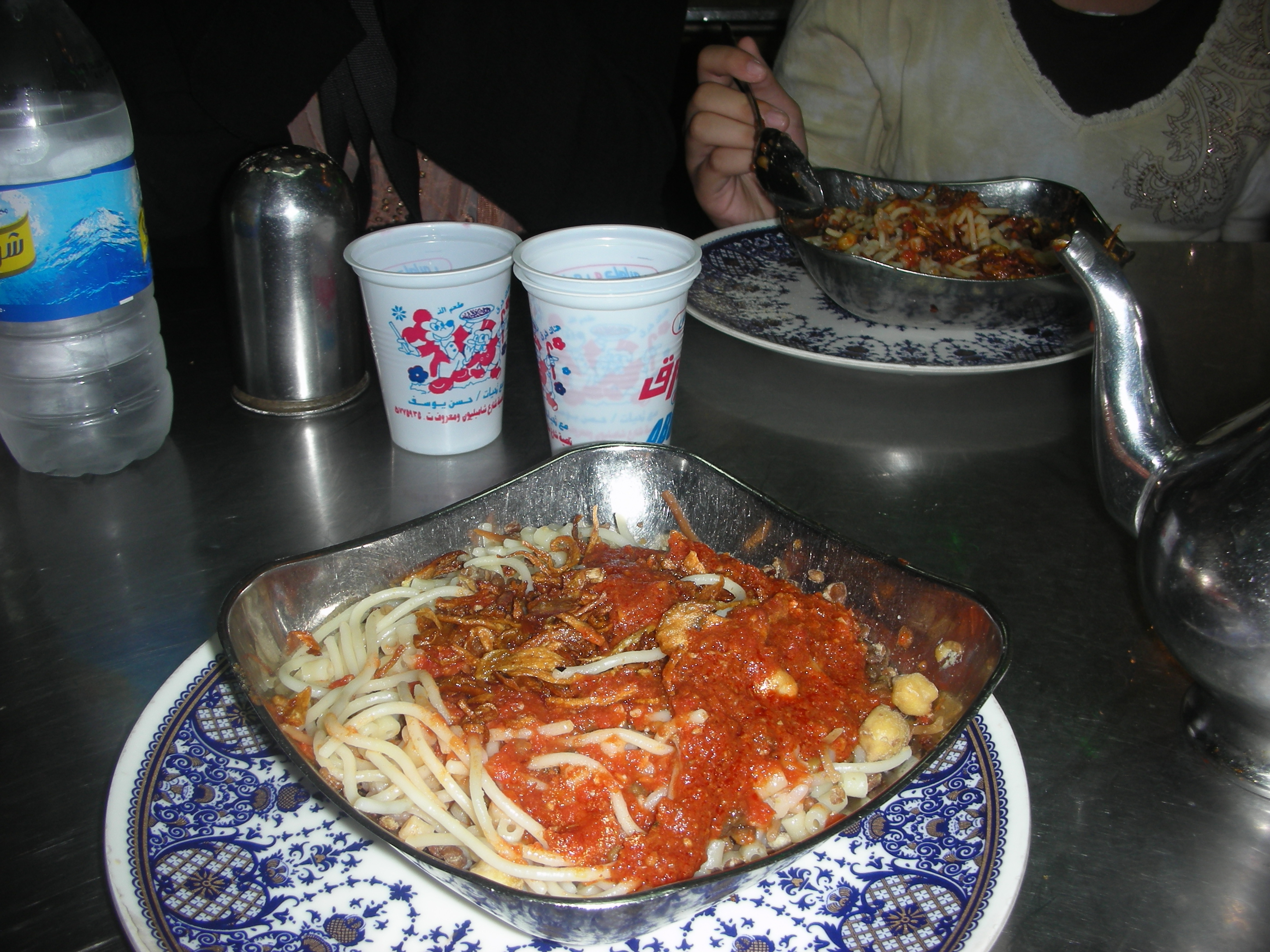
Koshary

El Koshary Today is an Egyptian online news website that features satire and political parody. The website is named after a common Egyptian dish consisting of a spaghetti mixture that may also contain lentils, rice, and chickpeas. According to Zohny, "Koshary is sort of a very reflective meal of the country in the sense that it's a very chaotic kind of meal".

== Beginnings ==
The website began in 2008 when three friends got together to start a newspaper similar to America's The Onion, but with a specific philosophy. When a newsprint edition didn't work out, they decided to publish online. Initially they wrote anonymously under the pen names Makarona (macaroni), Ward Zeyada (extra onions) and Subar Lox (large-sized Koshary).

News items are not added on any schedule, but as inspiration strikes. Past topics have included the 2011 Egyptian revolution as well as the 2012 Egyptian presidential election.

== Regular features ==
The El Koshary Today portal has the appearance of a mainstream news site. Sections are categorized in the same manner as news websites: Features, International, Opinions, Arts, Science-Fiction and Technology, Sports, and Mind and Soul, and even Classified ads and "Horrorscopes."

Fake headlines mock the news by putting a twist on actual government messages. One such mock headline quoted the government as saying, "Complaining to strangers may lead to annihilation," a play on government ads warning Egyptians not to talk with foreigners.

== Impact ==
The website's philosophy is to use satire and imagination to raise awareness of national issues in a way that is humorous, but also invites action. Websites such as El Koshary Today and others have been credited with part of a larger global trend towards the use of social media and humor to create political change that reached a much broader public during the 2011 Egyptian revolution in Cairo's Tahrir Square.

== See also ==
- List of satirical magazines
- List of satirical news websites
- List of satirical television news programs
