= The Fauxy =

Indian satire website

- The Fauxy
- Website type: Satirical Website
- Available in: English, Hindi, Gujarati
- Headquarters: Gurgaon, Haryana
- Creator: Vinay Sharma
- Website: thefauxy.com
- Launched: August 2018
- Current status: Active

The Fauxy is an Indian satirical website that publish satirical articles on current events, entertainment, sports and public figures. It has been referred to as India's answer to The Onion.

== History ==
The Fauxy, registered under Prana Online Media Networks LLP, was created by Vinay Sharma and was launched in August 2018. The Fauxy is headquartered in Gurgaon Haryana and has over 50 contributors across India. According to its founder, the website was launched as there was almost no competition to the existing satire website, Faking News.

Shortly after the launch, The Fauxy started getting featured on popular new portals and many of its satirical pieces were mistaken for real news.

== Media coverage ==
During the Russia-Ukraine crisis, many European countries imposed economic sanctions on Russia. The Fauxy wrote a satirical piece taking a dig at Pakistan. The article was mistaken to be true and many international media outlets covered it as real news.

Kangana Ranaut trolled for sharing The Fauxy article Facebook Launches "Mark Yourself Safe From Shivsena Goons" Feature. After that Kangana tweeted on her Twitter account and wrote:

The news have tagged it's [sic] account clearly says its a fictitious news source. Intended for sarcasm and satire.

== See also ==
- List of satirical news websites
