= The True North Times =

- The front page of The True North Times in September, 2015. News is organized by region and topic.
- Type: Fact-based news satire
- Format: Online publication
- Owner: The True North Times Inc.
- Launched: 14 February 2014
- Website: truenorthtimes.ca

The True North Times Inc.
- Company type: Private
- Industry: Media
- Founded: 2014
- Headquarters: Montreal, Quebec, Canada
- Key people: Simren Sandh (President & CEO); Daniel Etcovitch (former CMO & CSO); Max Seltzer (former COO & Editor-in-Chief)
- Products: The True North Times; Shit Trudeau Says; Ford Says What?
- Website: corporate.truenorthtimes.ca

The True North Times is an online publication focused on Canadian politics and affairs. Its coverage features federal, provincial, and municipal news, as well as lifestyle and other features. Launched in early 2014, The True North Times has gained notoriety among Canadians with high-profile interviews, articles, and election coverage being referenced in reputable, national news sources. In a departure from contemporary satire in Canada, The True North Times draws inspiration from The Daily Show in the United States, in that it does not write parody articles, like one may find in The Onion. Instead, it comments on actual news stories, with the stated goal of using a more accessible style of reporting to reach otherwise apathetic voters, especially in the youth demographic.

== History ==
The True North Times was founded in October 2013 by a small group of students at McGill University who saw youth political apathy as a problem and saw a gap in the media market, leaving room for an outlet that could be more accessible. After building a team and finding writers, the publication itself publicly launched on 14 February 2014.

In March 2014, The True North Times began a series of interviews with candidates for mayor of Toronto, in the midst of scandals surrounding Mayor Rob Ford. In April, the publication gained some notoriety for its coverage of the Quebec Election, often using mockery to express criticism against the governing party, the Parti Quebecois. In May 2014, they published an interview with the Honourable Elizabeth May, the leader of the Green Party of Canada.

== Format ==
=== Articles ===
As of July 2015, The True North Times published over 800 articles (10 to 20 articles each week), normally devoted to recent events in Canadian politics and representing views across the political spectrum.

==== Columns ====
The True North Times also publishes weekly columns, notably a review of 24/SEVEN, the documentary series following the Canadian Prime Minister; Crazy Canadian Comments, a round-up of the worst troll comments from across the internet; Canada From Eh to Zed, a lifestyle column posting recipes and fashion; and Counter-Counter-Counter-Point, where two (or more) columnists sound-off on the same issue, each presenting a different viewpoint.

=== Interviews ===
The Torontopocalypse 2014 series is devoted to interviewing all of the niche candidates running for mayor of Toronto. They have interviewed fringe candidates Matt Mernagh, Carlie "Barbie Bitch" Ritch, Ari Goldkind, Jeff Billard, Sketchy the Clown, Selina Chan, Erwin Sniedzins, and Morgan Baskin. As well, in March 2014 they interviewed Elizabeth May, leader of the Green Party of Canada.

=== Videos ===
The True North Times has done literal closed captioning of federal campaign ads, as well as spoofed videos, such as the “Student Vote Represents Nothing” video in coverage of Montreal students who were disenfranchised in the April 2014 Provincial election.

=== Graphics ===
The publication has delved into a few visual design projects, from Valentine's Day Cards depicting the likeness of politicians with erotic quotations to a highly-circulated infographic imagining a Quebec Republic's borders, policies, and economy.

=== Interactive media ===
Who Said It? – A series which contrasts quotes from two public figures in order for users to try to guess who said the quote in question. So far, there has been Justin Trudeau or Superman? And Thomas Mulcair or Donald Trump? In addition, numerous quizzes and voter compass games have been featured on the site.

== See also ==
- List of satirical magazines
- List of satirical news websites
- List of satirical television news programs
- Rick Mercer Report
- This Hour Has 22 Minutes
