= BBspot =

Satire website

- Website type: Entertainment
- Owner: BBspot LLC
- Founder: Brian Briggs
- Website: bbspot.com
- Launched: 1999

BBspot is a geek satire and humour web site founded in 2000. In 2003, the site was successful enough that webmaster Brian Briggs "quit his day job" and made the site his full-time vocation. BBspot is most notable for its technology news satire.

The most successful hoaxes by BBspot include an article about premium accounts on Twitter and claims about the MPAA conducting surveillance in private residences.

BBspot is a founding member of HumorFeed, a community of news satire webmasters; Briggs is also a member of the editorial board for Check Please!, a journal devoted to the serious examination of news satire and journalism.

Content updates to BBSpot ceased in November 2011, experiencing intermittent down time in the years that followed. It resumed in December 2017 with the story "Valve Contracts George R. R. Martin to Complete Half-Life Story".

== Content ==
BBspot is most notable for its news satire, which mainly covers technology, Microsoft, and Hollywood. Responses from "BBelievers" who are fooled by the stories are posted approximately weekly. Since 2006, the site also hosts The PC Weenies cartoons by Krishna M. Sadasivam, which replaces the FuzzyLogic cartoons created between 2001 and 2004.

BBspot issues an award, the Technical Award of Excellence, for gadgets and technology, based on a series of obscure or superficial challenges; such as coin flips, who has the best mascot, logo or name, and the web site.

The site also contains movie trailer reviews, internet-based guffs ("BBloopers"), regular guest columns and other items of general interest. There is also a forum.

== Press coverage ==
Several mainstream media outlets have represented the satire on the site as real news. Fooled outlets include TechTV's The Screen Savers show, the Discovery Channel as well as radio shows, major newspapers and books.

== Awards ==
BBspot won third place in the HumorFeed Satire News Awards twice, in 2006 for its story "Microsoft's AntiSpyware Tool Removes Internet Explorer" and in 2007 for "Teen Using Myspace To Lure Bands to Los Angeles". The Register named BBspot the "best tech humour site" in 2000.

== See also ==
- List of satirical magazines
- List of satirical news websites
- List of satirical television news programs
