= The Daily Squib =

British satirical online publication

- Type: Daily Satire
- Editor: Aur Esenbel
- Founded: 1 April 2007
- Headquarters: London, England
- Website: www.dailysquib.co.uk

The Daily Squib is a British satirical online publication created by satire writer Aur Esenbel, that was officially launched on April Fool's Day, 2007. Its coverage extends across world politics, science, technology, business, sports and health.

== Spoofs, humorous takes and social commentary ==
On 7 February 2008, The Daily Squib published a spoof article in which it was claimed that the Ku Klux Klan had chosen to endorse Barack Obama in the 2008 US presidential elections in order to avoid the election of Hillary Clinton. The spoof was misinterpreted by some readers as a factual article, and quickly became a widely circulated internet rumour that was discussed in articles by Reuters and The Times (London). An article in the Tampa Bay Times subsequently reported that the Ku Klux Klan had been repeatedly contacted with requests to verify their stance regarding The Daily Squib's story. And in April 2008, American rapper Snoop Dogg re-circulated the rumour generated by the Daily Squib story in an interview with The Guardian.

On 3 February 2009, The Daily Squib published a humorous article satirizing the UK's helpless response to prolonged snowfall in February 2009. The spoof article was featured in the Daily Mail and claimed that Hitler had planned to use 'snow zeppelins' as weapons of attack in order 'to disrupt Britain's ability to function'.

On 4 August 2010, The Daily Squib published a spoof article detailing the exploits of a masturbating Transportation Security Administration official and a full body X-ray scanner. The satirical story drew considerable attention, such that the TSA ultimately issued a public statement denying that the incident had occurred on their blog.

A Daily Squib story satirizing an interview with former United States Secretary of State, Henry Kissinger first published on 27 November 2011 was cited as a factual story by flagship Egyptian newspaper Al-Ahram, on 16 September 2012. The Daily Squib Kissinger satire, was also mentioned by former John Major era Chancellor of the Exchequer, Norman Lamont on 6 March 2012 in the New Statesman.

On 19 October 2012 a Daily Squib article which featured a fake EU poster that contained the Soviet hammer and sickle symbol was mistaken for a real EU poster by the Conservative MEP Daniel Hannan.

The Daily Squib editor, Aur Esenbel, was interviewed for award-winning magazine, The Big Issue, published on 23 November 2018. The article discussed the variance in fake news and satire. Esenbel elucidated readers about the Daily Squib's literary style: “The tone is Juvenalian satire, that is to say, it is harder hitting than the jolly harmless Horatian kind, which is prevalent in so many other sites.”

On 3 February 2023 Reuters news agency fact-checked a quote attributed to veteran U.S. diplomat Henry Kissinger on controlling the food supply to control people is true. “Control oil and you control nations. Control foods and you control the people,” is a quote spread across the internet as millions of viral memes. Jessee LePorin, Press Officer for Kissinger told Reuters that he “has never said that quotation or anything like it on any social media or anywhere else.” The earliest iteration Reuters could identify dates to 2011, when the quotation appeared as part of a satirical interview by The Daily Squib a site that describes itself as “the rock star of all news and satire” on its About page.

On 30 November 2023 The Daily Squib editor, Aur Esenbel interviewed former Conservative Party UK MP Ann Widdecombe on the subject of Brexit including the threat of Brexit being reversed if the Labour Party UK was voted in at the 2024 United Kingdom general election. Widdecombe's answer to the question of Labour's "threat" to Brexit was a simple "Yes".

On 18 December 2023 The Daily Squib editor, Aur Esenbel interviewed former Conservative Party Chancellor of the Exchequer Lord Norman Lamont of Lerwick on the subject of Brexit and his stance in the House of Lords preserving the 2016 United Kingdom European Union membership referendum as well as the multiple problems encountered with the UK's ongoing relationship with the European Union.

On 27 December 2023 The Daily Squib editor, Aur Esenbel, a guitarist himself and long-time listener interviewed iconic guitarist Steve Vai on his "career and spirit related subjects". When asked about his legendary composition For the Love of God (instrumental) an excerpt of Vai's reply displays his deep appreciation of spiritual matters relating to his music, life and death: "Humans do not have souls, they are soul. That is actually all we are. We are not our past, or our name, the thoughts in our head or even our body."

On 5 February 2025, The Daily Squib published a satirical article imagining what President Donald Trump would do to the Gaza Strip once it gets cleared out. On 26 February 2025, through his social media site Truth Social, President Trump posted an almost identical AI video representation of the Daily Squib spoof article on Gaza.

On 22 April 2025, The Daily Squib published a satirical article imagining President Donald Trump as the next Pope after the death of Pope Francis. On 3 May 2025 Donald Trump posted an almost identical AI image of himself as the Pope on Truth Social which went viral.

== Censorship and Threats ==
On 11 July 2017, after ten years online, The Daily Squib satirical article "Ku Klux Klan Endorses Obama" was pulled off the site after Google demanded the article be removed or The Daily Squib would lose its advertising. The editor of The Daily Squib, Aur Esenbel replied citing the "loss of freedom of speech", "censorship of satire", and how Google had "completely misunderstood the premise of the satirical article".

== Global creative awards jury ==
The Daily Squib, was chosen alongside well-known industry journals such as Adweek, Campaign magazine, Creative Review to be one of the jurors with jury president Spencer Baim, Chief Strategic officer at Vice Media for the globally acclaimed 2017 Epica Awards showcasing creativity in advertising, film and design.

== PHNX Tribute creative jury ==
The Daily Squib, Editor, Aur Esenbel, was chosen as a jury member for the 2020, PHNX Tribute., a celebration of individual creatives and teams within the creative industry.

== Announcement of The Daily Squib Anthology: From 2007 to 2022 book ==
On 21 August 2022 The Daily Squib, Editor, Aur Esenbel, announced in an article on the website of the publication of the new book. According to the publisher Curtis Press, The Daily Squib Anthology From 2007 to 2022 will be published on Paperback, A4, greyscale, 138 pages on 1 October 2022. Quotes from the book's description acknowledge the history of The Daily Squib throughout its 15-year tenure on the internet: "As the follies and absurdities of the powerful are destroying the world through war, pandemic, and climate change, what better time to release The Daily Squib: Anthology from 2007 to 2022? Over the last 15 years, the Squib has held a crazy distorted fairground mirror to global events. Sometimes its spoofs have even been mistaken for real news—what higher accolade is there for a satirist? Its mock report on the Ku Klux Klan declaring its support for Barack Obama in the 2008 US elections and its fake interview with Henry Kissinger (2011) fooled “serious” outlets across the world. More than that, the Squib has somehow become an unholy satirical oracle by predicting an EU army 5 years before anyone else was talking about it and, in 2018, the COVID-19 pandemic, even pinpointing “somewhere in Asia” as the source. Though like lots of other good things this has been overlooked by the mainstream media, the Squib has played an innovative role in shaping internet-based comedy since 2007 and has fought hard for free speech in a climate of increasing puritanism on both the political left and right."

== Satirical prophecy ==
The Daily Squib has often accurately predicted actual events.

Among the eminent examples are:

- In a 2015 article satirising the "global warming" hysteria of the time, the Daily Squib accurately predicted the advent of the suicide pod to alleviate overpopulation and lower the human carbon footprint.
- In a 2018 prophetic satirical and imaginary interview with Henry Kissinger, the Daily Squib accurately predicted a "virus that suddenly erupts most probably from somewhere in Asia" presaging the coming COVID-19 pandemic. The same article also predicted a conflict in the Middle East with Israel: "The supreme land of Eretz Ha’Avot, our motherland, our home will fight with all its might now to cleanse the Middle East of threats to Israel. This is the time to cut out the tumour that has haunted us for so long, and Bibi, my protégé, will take no prisoners".

== See also ==
- List of satirical magazines
- List of satirical news websites
- List of satirical television news programs
