= Le Gorafi =

Satirical French website

- Website type: Pure player
- Available in: French
- Creators: Pablo Mira; Sébastien Liebus
- Website: legorafi.fr
- Commercial: No
- Launched: 2012
- Current status: Online

Le Gorafi (French pronunciation: [lə ɡɔʁafi]; anagram of Le Figaro) is a news satire website. It was created in May 2012 during the French presidential campaign in the style of The Onion, a satirical newspaper of fake information. It has also been compared with Infos du Monde and L'Examineur.

Since 2014, the site is also offered in a televisual form on channel Canal+ as a humoristic segment on the program Le Grand Journal. The identity of the creators was unknown until January 2014, when the two creators, Pablo Mira and Sébastien Liebus, became known in the media.

== History ==
=== Sources ===
Caricatures of the press or pamphlet have existed for centuries; the drawing is generally grotesque which means that the reader has no possible doubt on the fact that it is a parody and not reality.

In October 1996, producer and television presenter Karl Zéro was suspended by his employer; after that most of his parodies included the mention "produced with fakery".

In March 2010, the marketing director of Apple Inc. Ken Segall founded Scoopertino, a fake agency of parodical press dedicated to promoting the Apple brand in a strange way. The disruptive innovation is that at no moment is it mentioned that it is a parody, which is judicially a counterfeit.

=== Beginnings ===
The articles of Le Gorafi comment real or imaginary events in a satirical and offbeat way, taking again most of the press codes. Le Gorafi was first an element on Twitter that began in February 2012, during the French presidential campaign, before being transformed as a blog in May, and then becoming in September 2012 a website. Since then, many of its articles were relayed in the press, especially the one stating about a supposed new challenge undertaken by Felix Baumgartner who would have decided to cross alone the entire region of Île-de-France taking the RER B.

=== Institution of the web ===
The site presents the newspaper as dating of 1826, from a scission after a conflict of interest at the redaction of Le Figaro and named Le Gorafi due to the dyslexia of its founder Jean-René Buissière. The contents are compared to the "Page Pute" of Brain Magazine, or other humoristic and satirical sites like Bilboquet Magazine and L'Humour de droite, which reacts on Twitter and Facebook. Le Gorafi claims more than 400,000 viewers in February 2013 and regularly more than 900,000 viewers per month stated by Les Inrocks.

In January 2014, the book L'année du Gorafi 2013 was released at the Éditions Denoël. In November of that year, the following book titled L'année du Gorafi 2 was released, and the creators were invited at the radio program of media criticism L'Instant M broadcast on France Inter for 15 minutes.

On 31 August 2015 in the morning, Le Gorafi created a "fake bad buzz" posting a temporary redirection with a message "Le Gorafi, c'est fini, merci de votre fidélité" ("Le Gorafi, it's over, thank you for your fidelity"). It was in fact an "advertising attempt for its new platform".

== Formats ==
The articles of Le Gorafi are mainly published on its website, and distributed between different themes (politics, society, science, economy, etc.) like some sites of authentic information. It is also possible to read fake horoscopes and watch small videos. The site also has Facebook, Twitter, Instagram and YouTube accounts. The latter is not active anymore but published 40 videos between September 2016 and August 2017, which totaled 292,000 views in November 2019. Every year since 2014, a selection of articles is published in books titled L'Année du Gorafi, but the 2017 edition only contains unpublished articles.

The incomes of the company are insured by the book sales, the presence of several advertisements on the site, as well as sponsored advertising articles.

== Television ==
=== Le Grand Journal ===
In spring 2014, Le Gorafi presents a chronicle in Le Grand Journal, twice or three times a week, often on Monday, Wednesday or Friday. The programs are based on one or two chronicles developed around one theme for each. The first theme is the object of the treatment of twisted news presented in a satirical tone by one of the two co-founders Pablo Mira, of a length between two and four minutes. He sometimes talks about a second subject, which is expanded of an enquiry shown as a report with video pictures, illustrated by micro-sidewalks or expert advice.

=== L'Année du Gorafi ===
In January 2016, Le Gorafi presents a parodical program retrospective of the news from the previous year. Presented by Pablo Mira, the program is a caricature of the news broadcasting from a continuous news channel, alternating fake reports and television stage launches.

== Bibliography ==
- Jean-François Buissière (Pablo Mira, Sébastien Liebus) (2014). Éditions Denoël (ed.). L'année du Gorafi 2013 (in French). p. 240. ISBN 9782207117163. Journal d'un mythomane, volume 2.

== See also ==
- List of satirical magazines
- List of satirical news websites
- List of satirical television news programs
