= The Daily Currant =

American satirical news blog

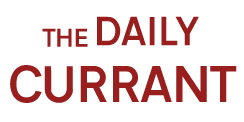
- Website type: Blog
- Owner: Currant Daily
- Website: currantdaily.com
- Commercial: Yes
- Launched: July 2012
- Current status: offline

The Daily Currant was an American satirical news blog that focused on politics, technology, and entertainment. A number of its satirical stories have been mistaken for true news reports by the media.

The Daily Currant was a competitor to The Onion. According to Quantcast, the site received over 1.5 million page views a month. By November 22, 2016, the site was no longer in operation.

== Articles ==
Several Daily Currant articles were reported by established news organizations, sometimes as fact.

=== "Rick Santorum on Grindr" ===
On July 3, 2012, the website published a satirical article saying that Rick Santorum had been caught using the gay dating app Grindr by a journalist during an interview. In the article, Santorum admitted using the app but said that he was looking for the nearest coffee shop. Mashable later published an article, "Satirical Post About Santorum and Grindr Fools the Web".

=== "George Bush Accidentally Votes for Obama" ===
On November 6, 2012, the website published a satirical article saying that former president George W. Bush had accidentally voted for Barack Obama because he could not figure out how to use the voting machine. The article was reported as fact by news outlets in Texas, went viral on the Internet and appeared on the website of La Repubblica, Italy's largest national newspaper.

=== Todd Akin hoax ===
Another story to receive wide publicity (and belief) was "Todd Akin Claims Breastmilk Cures Homosexuality", about conservative US congressman Todd Akin. The article was widely shared on social media, and many people believed it was true.

=== "Paul Krugman Declares Personal Bankruptcy" ===
On March 6, 2013, the site published a satirical article which said that Nobel Prize–winning economist Paul Krugman had filed for bankruptcy. Breitbart thought the story was true, and later deleted its post without explanation.

=== "Message from God on Mars" ===
Viral e-mails and Facebook posts said in 2013 that NASA's Curiosity rover had found gigantic stone tablets in a cave near Aeolis Mons which were marked with the Ten Commandments and the phrase "I Am Real". The hoax originated as a satirical Daily Currant article.

=== "Marijuana Overdoses Kill 37 in Colorado on First Day of Legalization" ===
A story concocted shortly after recreational marijuana became legal in Colorado said that 37 people had died of marijuana overdoses, with the death toll expected to reach as high as 300 by the following week. The article contained a number of references to fictional characters, including one to Breaking Bad's Jesse Pinkman. Its satirical nature was not recognized by some, including Swedish Minister for Justice Beatrice Ask and Annapolis Police Department chief Michael A. Pristoop.

== See also ==
- List of satirical magazines
- List of satirical news websites
- List of satirical television news programs
