= Sovetskaya Belorussiya (Telegram channel) =

Telegram Channel in Belarus

Sovetskaya Belorussiya Советская Белоруссия
- Type: Telegram channel
- Format: Satire, parody, fake news
- Founded: 2019
- Language: Russian, Belarusian
- Country: Belarus
- Website: t.me/sovbelarussia

Sovetskaya Belorussiya (Russian: Советская Белоруссия) is a satirical parody Telegram channel. It was established in 2019 under the name "ШUT.BY" (English: SHUT.BY) as a personal "notebook" for satirical notes. After gaining popularity in 2020, it was renamed "Sovetskaya Belorussiya", parodying another Belarusian media outlet, SB. Belarus Today. The channel's author writes satirical news-style notes and parodies Belarusian state-run publications. Some posts have occasionally been mistaken for real news and have been reprinted by both state and independent Belarusian media.

== History ==
The Telegram channel was created in October 2019 under the name "ШUT.BY" (Note: A parody of the popular portal TUT.BY) and initially served as a personal "notebook" for satirical observations. The first satirical news item was titled "Belarus Withdraws from the Agreement on Reducing the Number of Eggs in a Carton". By the summer of 2020, the channel had only 50 subscribers. Its popularity began to grow after an anonymous reader actively promoted it. Upon reaching 500–1000 subscribers, the channel rebranded to "Sovetskaya Belorussiya," (Note: A parody of the well-known Belarusian newspaper, which changed its name to "SB. Belarus Today" in 2018.) and changed its format. By October 1, 2020, it had 18,000 subscribers, compared to only 800 for the original "SB. Belarus Today". By March 2021, the subscriber count had grown to 26,000. Rumors of the channel administrator's detention surfaced in March 2021, sparked by a post announcing an "unpaid leave for 15 days starting March 25" and the subsequent pause in updates. Later, the author reassured readers with a comment that he was "not yet detained".

=== Administrator's arrest and channel takeover ===
On April 28, 2021, the channel's administrator stopped responding. The next day, it became evident that the channel had been hacked, with posts mocking members of the Belarusian Democratic Opposition. Within two days, the subscriber count dropped from 30,000 to 13,000. Posts mocking the administrator himself also appeared, calling him a "Nazi." Media outlets identified the likely identity of the channel's creator. A judge from the Frunzensky District Court of Minsk found the man guilty under two articles of the Administrative Code of the Republic of Belarus and sentenced him to 25 days of arrest. On April 29, 2021, a new channel was created by administrators of "Ha-ha, I Live Here!" (Belarusian: Ха-ха, я тут жыву!) to replace the compromised one. They promised to hand over the new channel to the creator upon his release.

== Style and content ==
The channel publishes jokes written in the style of real news reports. Typically, new posts respond to statements by high-ranking officials or significant socio-political incidents. The channel uses the method of "discourse interception" to reflect on events in the country.

The project frequently assigns humorous titles to politicians and propagandists. For instance, it refers to analyst Aleksandr Shpakovsky as a "political sommelier" (Russian: политический сомелье), (Note: A reference to the analyst's possible fondness for alcohol.) and Alexei Dzermant as a "political witch doctor" (Russian: знахарь-политолог). (Note: A reference to the state political scientist's neo-Nazi and pagan past.) The channel refers to Sviatlana Tsikhanouskaya as the "junta-ess" (Russian: Хунтесса). In 2024, amid heightened Belarusian propaganda about the poverty of the Baltic states, "Sovetskaya Belorussiya" frequently published content about "hungry Latvians".

The Telegram channel also engages readers with interactive polls. In one such survey, it asked followers to choose between "Alexander Lukashenko or Nuclear War." Ninety percent of readers chose nuclear war.

The satirical channel's news has often been taken seriously and reprinted by other media. For instance, on September 27, 2020, Belteleradio shared a "Sovetskaya Belorussiya" post on its Telegram channel, claiming that elderly activist Nina Baginskaya had roughly shoved an OMON officer into a minibus.

== Reception ==
Sviatlana Tsikhanouskaya mentioned her appreciation for the satirical channel in an interview: "You know, we really need more positive emotions right now. I occasionally read this Telegram channel, and I love what they do. I enjoy it when, right before bedtime, there's a post: 'Tsikhanouskaya, are you asleep?' I’m not; I’m reading." She also added, "A worthy channel that lifts the spirits".

"The Village Belarus" noted that the channel's authors skillfully use real context, events, and pro-government rhetoric in their posts.

According to Alexander Gradyushko, "Sovetskaya Belorussiya" has taken on a leading role in the Belarusian media landscape.

== See also ==
- The Onion
- Panorama
