= Khabaristan Times =

Pakistani news satire website (2014–2017)

- Type: Satirical newspaper
- Format: Website
- Founder(s): Kunwar Khuldune Shahid, Luavut Zahid
- Founded: 2014
- Ceased publication: January 25, 2017
- Website: khabaristantimes.com (defunct)

Khabaristan Times (KT) was a Pakistani digital news satire publication, run by journalists Kunwar Khuldune Shahid and Luavut Zahid, who were the brains behind the content. Shahid was the editor of the publication, while Zahid took up responsibilities as the CEO. The website published satirical articles on national and local issues. The website was blocked for viewership within Pakistan by the Pakistan Telecommunication Authority on January 25, 2017.

Khabaristan Times was a renowned satire and parody website with its commentary on Pakistani politics and the military. In 2015, a satirical piece by the website went viral and was reported by the annual symposium Women in the World and international medial outlets. In 2017, KT was reportedly blocked in Pakistan. Khabaristan Times ceased to exist in April 2017.

== See also ==
- List of satirical news websites
