= Southend News Network =

- Website type: Entertainment website
- Creator: Simon Harris
- Website: southendnewsnetwork.net
- Launched: October 2015; 11 years ago
- Current status: Inactive

Southend News Network (SNN) was a news parody website in the United Kingdom.

== History ==
The website was established in October 2015. It was inspired by the The Onion, The Daily Mash and The Poke parody sites.

In February 2016, it was reported that the spoof stories were being taken as fact by readers. Fake stories, such as a claim that trick-or-treating children would need a permit from Southend Council at Halloween, caused readers to contact the council directly. To keep ahead of future spoofs, the website was added to media monitoring.

In March 2016, social media accounts of the English Defence League, a far-right network, shared an SNN story about hot cross buns having the crosses removed on religious grounds. In August 2016, Katie Hopkins read a spoof story about an upcoming closure of the M25 motorway to listeners of the LBC radio station.

In January 2018, journalist Milo Yiannopoulos read out during a live YouTube broadcast a spoof article about a men's rights movement activist, prompting questions about his source checking.

The website closed in January 2024.

== Ownership ==
The owner of the website was initially anonymous, identified only as 'Chief Reporter'. In May 2017, it was identified by The Guardian as Simon Harris, a teacher in Essex. Harris also ran the YourBrexit website.

In January 2024, Harris was reported to have received almost £500,000 over the course of three years for online community engagement work during the COVID-19 pandemic that primarily included running a Facebook page. Harris deleted his online presence.

== See also ==
- List of satirical news websites
