= El Deforma =

Mexican satire website

Logo

El Deforma is a Mexican satirical news website. It is owned by SDP Noticias, whose director is Federico Arreola. El Deforma was co-founded in 2010 by Daniel Castillo. Poncho Gutiérrez is the website's creative director. Its name, "El Deforma" ('The Deformer'), is a parody of that of the newspaper Reforma.

The website gained notoriety after the publication of a 2013 article titled "Samsung paga multa de 1 billón de dólares a Apple en monedas de 5 centavos" ('Samsung Pays a $1 Trillion Fine to Apple in 5-Cent Coins'), a satirical reference to the actual ruling in Apple Inc. v. Samsung Electronics Co. Since, the website has been occasionally cited as a source by national and international media. In 2017, the website was acquired by SDP Noticias, partially owned by Grupo Televisa. As a result, the sale drew widespread criticism from its followers, who were critical of the conglomerate.

== See also ==
- List of satirical news websites
