= Adequacy.org =

Satirical website

- Website type: Satire / Humor
- Owner: Adequacy.org
- Creator: Site creator is only known by his user name "elby"
- Website: adequacy.org
- Registration: Optional
- Launched: July 4, 2001
- Current status: Shut down on September 11, 2002

Adequacy.org was a satirical web site. It featured articles on politics, religion, technology, history, and sociology, as well as the "Linux Zealot" cartoon series. The site shut down on September 11, 2002.

Adequacy.org's slogan was "News for grown-ups," a play on the slogan of the popular Slashdot technology news site, "News for nerds. Stuff that matters," as an Adequacy's founding editor claimed to have been a regular troll on Slashdot.

== Background ==
The Adequacy authors began as trolls on Slashdot and Kuro5hin, other technology-oriented discussion sites. They devised and posted many comments designed to provoke outraged responses; common styles included slighting a revered operating system or open source leader, or posting messages with simple but deliberate technical errors, which would incite hundreds of corrections.

After several years of such behavior, the Adequacy authors decided to open their own site consisting entirely of such articles intended to incite the reader, where users "in the know" would post comments agreeing with the articles.

Behind the scenes, the targets of the articles would be enticed to come to Adequacy and read the article. Adequacy members would post to weblogs, and other discussion forums, often pretending to be outraged by the article themselves. As an example, the article Not Just Harmless Fun, which argues that all anime is hentai and is designed to destroy Christian morals, was promoted on Usenet as such: "the author is some kind of Christian lunatic who believes that anime is all about paedophilia!". The person behind this Usenet posting was James "spiralx" Skinner, also known as "Jon Erikson", the author of the article in question. He later stated, "I wrote the article to wind up anime-loving geeks."

== Adequacy style ==
A popular device used in Adequacy articles was to hyperlink almost every word or phrase to another article on the Internet, related to the specific word or phrase linked, often humorously, but meaningless in the context of the article. Confined perspectives concerning subjects such as the British Empire were openly mocked; or the sentence "we survived a hardy winter" might have the word "hardy" linked to an article on Laurel and Hardy. Adequacy would also occasionally hyperlink to itself using words like "controversy" or phrases such as "the world's most controversial web site".

Adequacy would often deliberately misspell the targets of its satire. For example, Linux was always written as "Lunix", which has connotations of "lunatics" (although this spelling was already widely used in humorous contexts elsewhere, notably by Jeff K on Something Awful). Linus Torvalds was written as either "Linux Torvalds", "Lunix Torvaldez" or "Linyos Torovoltos", and claimed to be a native of various countries, most often Russia. There were also technological in-jokes such as the idea of "IP Tokens" which could be stolen by hackers and used for nefarious purposes if you didn't have the correct protection mechanisms. This predated genuine "your computer is broadcasting an IP address!" web adverts which try to scare people into buying firewalls.

Many respondents to Adequacy used the point by point rebuttal format for raising their objections. For a brief period, Adequacy responded to such comments by removing them from public view and replacing them with a "Deletion Notice", which contained only their consequently incoherent responses, together with a copyright violation notice, chastising the poster for reproducing the entirety of the contested article without the author's permission. This was termed a "War on Copyright Violation", perhaps as a satirical reference to the war on drugs or war on terrorism.

== Notable stories ==
As was the case for many humor-oriented Web sites, the mood on Adequacy was considerably more somber in the immediate aftermath of the September 11, 2001 terrorist attacks in New York City and Washington, DC. Consequently, Adequacy published many "straight" stories related to the attacks. One of the earliest satires of the global terrorism phenomenon to appear on the Internet, John Montoya's "Why The Bombings Mean That We Must Support My Politics", actually ridiculed the politicians and pundits who used the attacks as a platform to advance their particular views. Although the story contained no specific names, it was intended as a response to technology evangelist Eric S. Raymond, who had opined on the evening following the attacks that armed civilians on the airliners could have averted the attacks and that the "lawmakers who disarmed all the non-terrorists on those four airplanes" were in part responsible for them. Raymond's comments, published mere hours after the attacks had taken place, generated widespread outrage, even among those who otherwise supported his role as an open source spokesman.

The Adequacy story, which was initially published on September 12, was its most popular post-9/11 story and was eventually syndicated by AlterNet on October 2, 2001, causing it to be mentioned by a number of online news and discussion sites. The piece was also mentioned in The Industry Standard, wherein commentator Keith Dawson referred to it as "a brilliant height of satire".

In a return to more traditional fare, Adequacy used the October 2001 anthrax attacks against U.S. politicians and media figures as an occasion to petition the thrash metal band Anthrax to change their name. (The suggested replacement chosen by readers was "Basket Full Of Puppies".) The posted story implied that the band was engaged in "tasteless, juvenile antics" and that their name had been recently chosen in order to capitalize on the media coverage of the attacks. This prompted an angry response from Scott Ian, the band's rhythm guitarist:

Some asshole from something called the Adequacy Org. e-mailed us demanding that we change our name. The guy is clueless. He talks about our new album called Spreading The Disease, calls us Grind Core, Death Metal and Speed Metal. He thinks we named the band last week to 'take advantage of this horrific situation.' Last week.....twenty years ago....... No big difference there. What a jackass.

Adequacy first gained widespread Internet notoriety after the December 2, 2001 publication of a story entitled "Is Your Son a Computer Hacker?" The story was engineered to raise the hackles of as wide a swath of the Internet geek community as possible; it lampooned such topics as the Linux operating system, processors from Advanced Micro Devices, online gaming, and rave culture. Furor over the story spread quickly through technology / gaming blogs and Usenet newsgroups, and visitors came to the site in droves to express their opinions. The story received an official count of 5,913 individual comments, not including several thousand more that were hidden by the Adequacy editors. This figure even exceeds the record of the much more heavily visited Slashdot, which (as of November 21, 2006) stands at 5,687 replies to the story "Kerry Concedes Election to Bush".

The publicity of the hacker story reached its highest point on January 7, 2002, when Adequacy was featured as the "Site of the Night" on the TechTV television program The Screen Savers. Hosts Leo Laporte and Martin Sargent discussed the "warning signs" enumerated in the article individually, and while Laporte seemed inclined to believe that the article was a joke, neither was ultimately sure of what to make of it. "Is this a joke?" asked Laporte incredulously, to which Sargent replied "Do you think? I don't know. I can't tell."

On October 23, 2001, Adequacy published an interview with actor Wil Wheaton which consisted mostly of questions poking fun of his stint as Wesley Crusher on the television program Star Trek: The Next Generation. Wheaton, being familiar with the nature of the site, was willing to "play along" and provide the outrageous questions with equally outrageous answers. However, many of the readers of his own blog were not familiar with Adequacy and were dismayed over the answers that he had provided; Wheaton later expressed regret for doing the interview.

In April 2002, ex-stripper and Playboy model Koleen Brooks made national news when the voters of the town of Georgetown, Colorado voted to recall her from her position as the town's mayor, citing conduct "unbecoming to an elected official". Brooks granted an interview with Adequacy wherein she discussed her performance as mayor and the circumstances surrounding her recall.

== See also ==
- List of satirical news websites
