= Zaytung =

Turkish news website

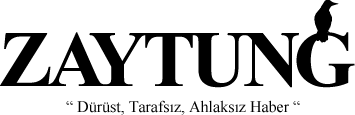
- Website type: Satire
- Available in: Turkish
- Owner: Hakan Bil
- Website: http://www.zaytung.com
- Users: 50.000 (2012)
- Current status: Active

Zaytung is a Turkish satirical news website. It was established in 2010. Its name comes from the German word zeitung meaning newspaper or journal. It is along the lines of American publication The Onion.

Zaytung also published an almanac in 2012. The almanac included news published by Zaytung in the years 2009–2011.

In February 2015, editors Cengiz Bayram, H. Nihat Güneş, Evren Kuçlu and Uğur Ceviz left Zaytung to establish a new satirical news website called Milli Gazete.

== See also ==
- List of satirical magazines
- List of satirical news websites
- List of satirical television news programs
