= Awaze Tribune =

The Awaze Tribune or AwazeTribune is an Eritrean news satire organization that publishes articles on international, national, and local news. Based in Asmara, Eritrea. The website carries articles that may cover current events, both real and fictional, satirizing the tone and format of traditional news organizations with stories, editorials, op-ed pieces, and man-in-the-street interviews using a traditional news website layout and an editorial voice modelled after The New York Times, and the usage of the AP Style of news writing.

== History ==
The articles of AwazeTribune mostly revolve around the coverage of real or imaginary events in a satirical and offbeat way, taking again most of the press codes. AwazeTribune appeared first as an element on Twitter that began in February 2016, during the American Presidential Elections, before being transformed to becoming a website. Since then, many of its articles were relayed in the press.

In its about page, the website claims to have been founded in 32 A.D., to have covered the baptism of Jesus Christ and the birth of the Prophet Mohammad, and to receive 14 billion unique daily hits.

The identity of the curators is yet unknown: in a recent interview with Radio France Internationale (RFI), one of the people associated with the website declined to be identified, stating that " the message of AT outweighs the identity of the curators."

== Controversy ==
Many users of social media have taken AwazeTribune articles to be literal (especially those which address controversial topics), and have expressed their anger and confusion online failing, according to one of the website's managers, to 'comprehend that the site makes a tongue-in-cheek news commentary revolving around the secretive Eritrean regime'.

== See also ==
- List of satirical news websites
