= Fognews =

Satirical news website of Russian origin

Fognews is a Russian news satire website. The website can be compared with The Onion (USA) and Private Eye (Britain).

In the spirit of the publication, there is a statement in Latin on their home page, "Nоvае rеs а nоbis confictae" (New things we have made up), however most readers would probably not understand it. An example of its "news" is the Aug. 17 story of the nationalist Russian politician, Vladimir Zhirinovsky (known for his erratic behavior and disruptive outbursts) resigning on account of his unacceptable behavior, and his calm and polite delivery of this notice is noted. Another is an Aug. 5 story of the renowned orchestra conductor and supporter of President of Russia Vladimir Putin, Valery Gergiev, halting a concert to deliver a protest speech about the harsh legal treatment of the punk band, Pussy Riot, for their protest stunt in a church.

== See also ==
- List of satirical news websites
