= De Speld =

Dutch news satire website

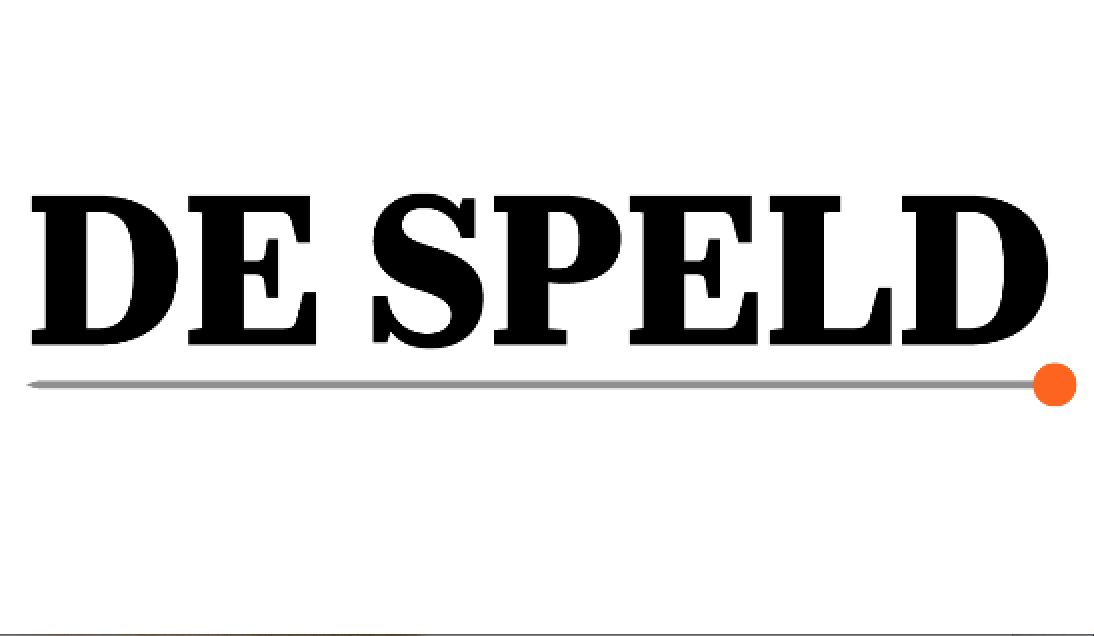
- Website type: Satirical website
- Available in: Dutch, English
- Editor: Jochem van den Berg
- Website: speld.nl
- Commercial: Yes
- Launched: September 11, 2007
- Current status: Active

De Speld is a Dutch news satire website. The website publishes satirical articles and videos parodying the style and content of regular news outlets. De Speld was founded in 2007 by Jochem van den Berg and Melle van den Berg (no relation). Since its inception, the website's office has been in Amsterdam. In 2014 and 2015 De Speld was the 'most viral website' of The Netherlands.

De Speld has published a small number of its articles translated into English.

== Awards ==
De Speld won the entertainment category of the 2011 Dutch website of the year election.

In 2016, De Speld won the People's Lovie Award for best Best Writing, defeating The Guardian and Vice.

== In other media ==
Since 2012, De Speld publishes a column in national daily De Volkskrant twice per week. From 2010 to 2012 the website had a similar column in the now defunct free newspaper De Pers.

In the past De Speld made radio items for WNL and Radio Veronica and from 2014 to 2015 the website had a daily segment in Pauw, a late night talkshow.

De Speld has published two books: Nederland het Boek. In vijf miljard jaar van supermacht naar wereldrijk ('The Netherlands the Book. In five billion years from superpower to global empire') a satirical take on Dutch history, in 2010 and Reisgids Binnenhof ('Binnenhof Travel Guide'), a faux travel guide to the Dutch governmental district, in 2015.

== See also ==
- List of satirical news websites
