= Internet Chronicle =

The Internet Chronicle is a satirical news website. It uses the domain chronicle.su. .su is the top level domain formerly used by the Soviet Union.

== See also ==
- The Onion
