= Faking News =

Indian satirical website

- Type: News Satire
- Format: Newspaper
- Owner: Network 18 Group
- Founder: Rahul Roushan
- Founded: 15 September 2008; 18 years ago
- Ceased publication: 11 July 2020
- Website: fakingnews.com

Faking News, originally started as a form of blog, was an Indian news satire website that published fake news reports containing satire on politics and society of India. It was a critique of mainstream news media in India. The website also published occasional serious articles related to television journalism in India. The website was launched on September 15, 2008.

It was founded by Rahul Roushan, a Delhi based management consultant, known by the pseudonym Pagal Patrakar, a Hindi term that literally translates to 'crazy/mad journalist' in English. Faking News was one of the few websites or blogs in India using the tools of sarcasm and humour to publish news satire, as is widely done in western countries, a trend pioneered by The Onion of the US.

On 31 May 2013, it was announced that Faking News had been acquired by Network 18-led First Post.

== News taken seriously ==
Two of the fake news reports by Faking News, "Unable to attract even a single girl, frustrated man sues Axe" and "Men talking loud on mobile during movies have smaller penises", were mistaken as being genuine and factual news reports by an Indian website Indiainfo.com on October 21, 2009, and were republished on their website. Subsequently, the Axe story was republished by many other websites and blogs in countries other than India, mistaking it to be a true story, twice by The Times of India on May 27, 2011 and on September 25, 2011 making it an urban legend. Another Faking News report titled "Unable to figure out Google Wave, youngster kills himself" was mistaken as being true by an Indian website Oneindia.in on November 10, 2009. Another instance of a Faking News article being taken seriously took place on December 22, 2013, when a satire article "IRCTC website running slow due to fog: committee report" was published as real news report by news magazine India Today. In another instance on May 28, 2014, legal team of BJP leader Nitin Gadkari quoted a Faking News article in their defence, mistaking it as a true news report, while arguing a defamation case.

== Achievements ==
- Faking News' Rahul Roushan created a full page 'Parody Times' in India's leading newspaper Hindustan Times on September 2, 2012 as a spoof of a front page of the same newspaper.

== Closing down ==
Faking news was closed down in July 2020. There are many reasons attributed towards the closing of this website but the company has not come out with any official statement. The most common reason is believed to be low revenue. It had over 370k visitors on its website and the revenue from google AdSense was very low. Another reason being attributed is the lack of creative content.

== See also ==
- List of satirical magazines
- List of satirical news websites
- List of satirical television news programs
