= Al-Hudood (website) =

Satirical news website

Al-Hudood الحدود
- Type: Satirical newspaper
- Format: Website
- Founder: Isam Uraiqat
- Founded: July 1, 2013; 12 years ago Amman, Jordan
- Headquarters: London, United Kingdom
- Website: alhudood.net

Al-Hudood (Arabic: الحدود The Limits or The Borders) is a satirical Arabic news publication founded July 2013. It originally focused on satirical journalism in Jordan, and came to encompass news from the Arab world and from around the world, working with Arab writers and cartoonists from different parts of the Middle East and North Africa.

== History ==
Isam Uraiqat, a Palestinian-Jordanian, co-founded Al-Hudood in Jordan in 2013. However after being denied registration in Jordan, the publication moved its operations to the U.K., where it has been based since.

Though Al-Hudood originated in Jordan, its focus has expanded to include the Middle East and North Africa and the Arab world in general.

== Organization ==
The website's team is composed of 7 full-time and 2 part-time employees, and about 20 freelance writers and 10 interns. Alhudood currently operates through grants, and it currently is funded from a grant by the European Endowment for Democracy, Open Society Foundations, and the Heinrich Boell Foundation, with a number of other funders now being interested in funding it for the coming future.

== Controversy ==
With the strong restrictions on freedom of speech in the region, Alhudood took advantage of the flexibility and freedom that satire provides, and became an alternative media outlet that discusses various important and sensitive regional issues. It tackles such issues without having to adhere to the limitations imposed on traditional media by authority and society due to the nature of fiction.

Alhudood has tackled issues of human rights, corruption, freedom of speech, gender equality and good governance, and portrays these themes in a manner that could be related to by readers from across the region, from an open, secular perspective, highlighting personal freedoms, freedom of speech, and feminism, using a darker, critical lens.

Especially after the political change that swept through the Arab world in 2011, the youth in the region have become either apathetic to politics, or engaged in current sectarian and political polarization, in both cases leading to a growing disinterest in political and social dialogue.

Even though it's an explicitly satirical network, Al-Hudood creates a substantial amount of controversy, particularly when the article crosses the three red lines: politics, religion, and sex. Some of its most controversial articles include:

=== Santa Claus arrested in Jabal Amman; all gifts confiscated ===
A number of major Jordanian news sources believed Al-Hudood's satirical story of Santa Claus's arrest, copying the article and publishing it as their own. Ad-Dustour printed the story in its newspapers such as Iram and Al-Watan, which led the Jordanian Public Security Directorate to release a statement renouncing the story, confirming that the security forces did not arrest "Santa Claus."

=== Discovery of Brotherhood plot to drown Egypt using prayers for rain ===
As was the case with the story about the arrest of Santa Claus, Al-Hudood's story about the Brotherhood plot to drown Egypt with prayers for rain was treated as a real news story; there was an outpour of accusations from supporters of the Egyptian president Abdelfattah Es-Sisi against the Muslim Brotherhood, accusing them of actually plotting to drown Egypt. A number of news sites and channels accused Sisi supporters of fabricating fake news stories to defame the Muslim Brotherhood.

=== Drug Enforcement Agency lists Jameed as a controlled substance ===
A number of news sites copied Al-Hudood's satirical report that the Jordanian Drug Enforcement Agency had listed jameed—a hard, dry yogurt and the key ingredient in mansaf—as a schedule I controlled substance because it allegedly "impairs focus." The news spread among Jordanians before the news sites discovered that the decision was not actually passed and deleted their articles, and before the Jordanian Fact-Checking Organization announced that the news was false.

This has been the case with several pieces by Alhudood, which have been taken, word for word, by other media and newspapers. In this regards, Alhudood has pushed some of the publications themselves to start questioning what they read, and do less of the copy-pasting.

Additionally, the website refrains from including the author's name in the byline in order to avoid danger.

== Awards ==
WAN/IFRA Middle East awards for Best in Social Media Engagement (2nd place) and Best Digital Project to Engage Younger and/or Millennial Audiences (3rd place)

The Drum Online Media Awards 2017, nominated for the Best Local/Regional News Site

The 2018 One World Media Award for the Special Award
