= Koleen Brooks =

American politician

Koleen Brooks (born 1965) is an American politician and model, and a former mayor of Georgetown, Colorado and topless dancer. She was ousted from her position as mayor due to "unbecoming" conduct and subsequently posed for Playboy, cashing in on her notoriety.

== Biography ==
=== Background ===
Brooks grew up in Georgetown, Colorado and gave birth to her son Dustin at the age of 17. She did not pursue education after high school, turning to topless dancing. By 2001, Brooks owned Dare 2 Be Different Tanning and Hair Salon.

=== Run for mayor ===
Brooks' entry into politics created much heat from the preservationist faction of the town. Her platform included the construction of a video arcade, a bowling alley and a skateboard park, introducing a concert venue, snowmobiles and barbecues all meant to update the town to the 21st century. These went against the preservationist view of saving the town's pastel Victorian style.

Brooks' supporters experienced pressure and social displacement for their support. Sign maker Wendell Pugh was fired for drawing a pro-Brooks cartoon. Tasso Maras' restaurant was boycotted by a group of citizens. In 2001, she won the election for the position of mayor with a 31-point margin. In her brief tenure, Brooks was accused of flashing her breasts in a bar, putting out a hit on a policeman who didn't support her and marijuana use.

=== Accusations ===
In February 2002, Brooks reported an attack on her life by a knife-wielding middle-aged man. After conflict erupted between her and the police force, the Colorado Bureau of Investigation stepped in and charged her with evidence-tampering and false reporting. Brooks' trial date was initially set on April 19 and then moved to May 24 with a change of venue. This allegation resulted in a recall vote and on April 2, she was forced to leave her position as mayor.

== Promotional career ==
Following her chaotic tenure, Brooks made appearances on talk shows and made a website that recalled her topless dancing days. She also posed for Playboy in an office inspired setting. An Emmy-winning writer of The Sopranos bought the rights to Brooks' story.
