= The Burrard Street Journal =

Online satire news website from Vancouver

- Website type: News satire
- Owner: John Egan
- Website: burrardstreetjournal.com
- Current status: Online

The Burrard Street Journal (or BSJ) is an online satire news website based in Vancouver, BC.

The site gained notoriety in August 2016 after a number of websites reported a BSJ article about then President Obama moving to Canada as fact.

Many other Burrard Street Journal articles and videos have been reported as real news. In July 2016, an article titled 'Trump Claims America Should Never Have Given Canada Its Independence' was shared over 9,000 times and in March 2016, an edited BSJ video reporting Donald Trump building a wall with Canada was shared over 50,000 times and has received 4.5 million views as of March 2018.

As a result of the BSJ's satire being copied and/or shared as real news, the website's founder, John Egan, has sent copyright infringement notices to more than 100 websites.
