= Panorama (Russian satirical website) =

Russian news satire website

Панорама
- To outpace an events (Russian: Опережая события)
- Type: Satirical newspaper
- Format: Website
- Founder(s): Boris Gontermakher; Vitaly Mann
- Editor: Boris Gontermakher
- Founded: 2017
- Website: panorama.pub

The Informational Agency "Panorama", shortened to Panorama, is a Russian-language satirical website which publishes satirical "news" on topical regional and international issues. It is analogous to the American digital media company The Onion. The Panorama has been known for using its articles by many famous Russian public figures and the media as real news, even though each article on this website is accompanied with the note "The text is a grotesque parody and is not real news".

== History ==
The website became operational in 2017. The project was founded by two people under the pen names of Boris Gontermakher and Vitaly Mann.

In an interview given in August 2020, Boris Gontermakher stated that the founders expected to teach Russian media and readers to fact check, but the goal was not met.

In another interview given in October 2021, Boris Gontermakher and Vitaly Mann said that they self-identified as liberals, but did not support modern left-wing ultra-liberalism.

According to Novaya Gazeta, Panorama's articles increasingly depict real news related to Russian politics. This is associated with the general degradation and exaggeration of political life in Russia.

== Staff ==
- Boris Gontermakher – editor-in-chief
- Vitaly Mann – correspondent
- Brazhek Zgolchich – storeman

== Financial situation ==
The Panorama is a project that is funded only on a non-profit basis. The founders' livelihood is secured through other activities.

== Notable articles ==
=== Articles which were perceived as real news by media and public figures ===
- The article about Grigory Rodchenkov's hospitalization was cited by Alexander Ionov, vice-president of the Russian branch of the International Human Rights Committee. Russia Today, with a reference to Ionov, published the news about a suicide attempt committed by Grigory Rodchenkov.
- The article about the saleswoman who sold pricked condoms to foreign football fans during the 2018 FIFA World Cup with a view to achieving an "improvement of the gene pool" was republished as real news by many media outlets, including Komsomolskaya Pravda, Moskovskij Komsomolets, Life.ru.
- The article about fictional Chinese minister Dzhian Ming who refused to shake the hand of Anatoly Chubais was not just cited by Andrey Karaulov, Russian journalist who was well known in 1990s, but was also confirmed by his statement that he had met Mr. Ming and had given this fictional Chinese minister his book as a gift.
- The article about the aid provided to participants of the protest against the construction of the Temple of Sacred Yekaterina in the Oktyabrskaya square in Yekaterinburg by the Boris Yeltsin Presidential Center was perceived as real news by Russian television presenter and propagandist Vladimir Solovyov (and this was not the first time that he referred the Panorama).
- The article about the European Union's claim for LGBT-character's inclusion for Russian animated television series Masha and the Bear was cited by Andrey Sidorov, the dean of the Faculty of World Politics of the Moscow State University, during television show Sunday Evening with Vladimir Solovyov.

=== Articles which caused official denial ===
- The article about Ryazan's balalaika players who were detained during the concert in Ventspils and subsequently deported from Latvia was officially denied by Latvian law-enforcement agencies.
- The article about self-driving truck Kamaz which destroyed the building of the factory's workshop during testing was officially denied by the company management.
- The article about fraudsters who took foreign tourists in false Lenin's Mausoleum was denied by TASS with the reference to law-enforcement agencies.

=== Articles which caused acute response by society ===
- The protest meeting against the Mark Rockefeller's appointment to CEO of the "Russian Federation" LLC, Seychelles-registered firm (it was another Panorama's publication), took place in Arkhangelsk in the end of 2019.
- After the article about Yelena Isinbayeva’s appointment to judge of the Constitutional Court of Russia as a reward for participation in the activity of the commission for the preparation of amendments to the Constitution of Russia, Yelena Isinbayeva was bullied in social media.

=== Articles which subsequently became real news ===
- On 10 April 2020, the Panorama published the article about homeless person who was fined for violation of the home isolation regime during the COVID-19 pandemic. Several days later, it became a reality.
- On 13 April 2021, the Panorama published the article about Federal Agency for Tourism's proposal for replacement of tourist's tours to Turkey to tours to Russian regions due the cancellation of air links with Turkey. In reality, such proposal was introduced on the next day only.
- The real news about the Sergei Shoigu's order to all military personnel to learn the Vladimir Putin's article "On the Historical Unity of Russians and Ukrainians" was "predicted" by the Panorama.

=== Articles which caused problems with public authorities ===
- After the article about COVID-19 vaccine based on the blood of former President of Kazakhstan Nursultan Nazarbayev was published, the website was blocked in Kazakhstan.
- On 24 October 2021, the Panorama published the article about the increase in ticket prices in public transport of Saint Petersburg. On 29 October 2021, the Governor of Saint Petersburg Alexander Beglov stated that he would demand to open a criminal case against employees of the Panorama.

== See also ==
- List of satirical news websites
