= Kyoko Shimbun =

Japanese satire website

- Available in: Japanese
- Owner: Kyoko Shimbunsha
- Creator: UK (Publisher of Kyoko Shimbunsha)
- Website: kyoko-np.net
- Launched: March 2004
- Current status: Active

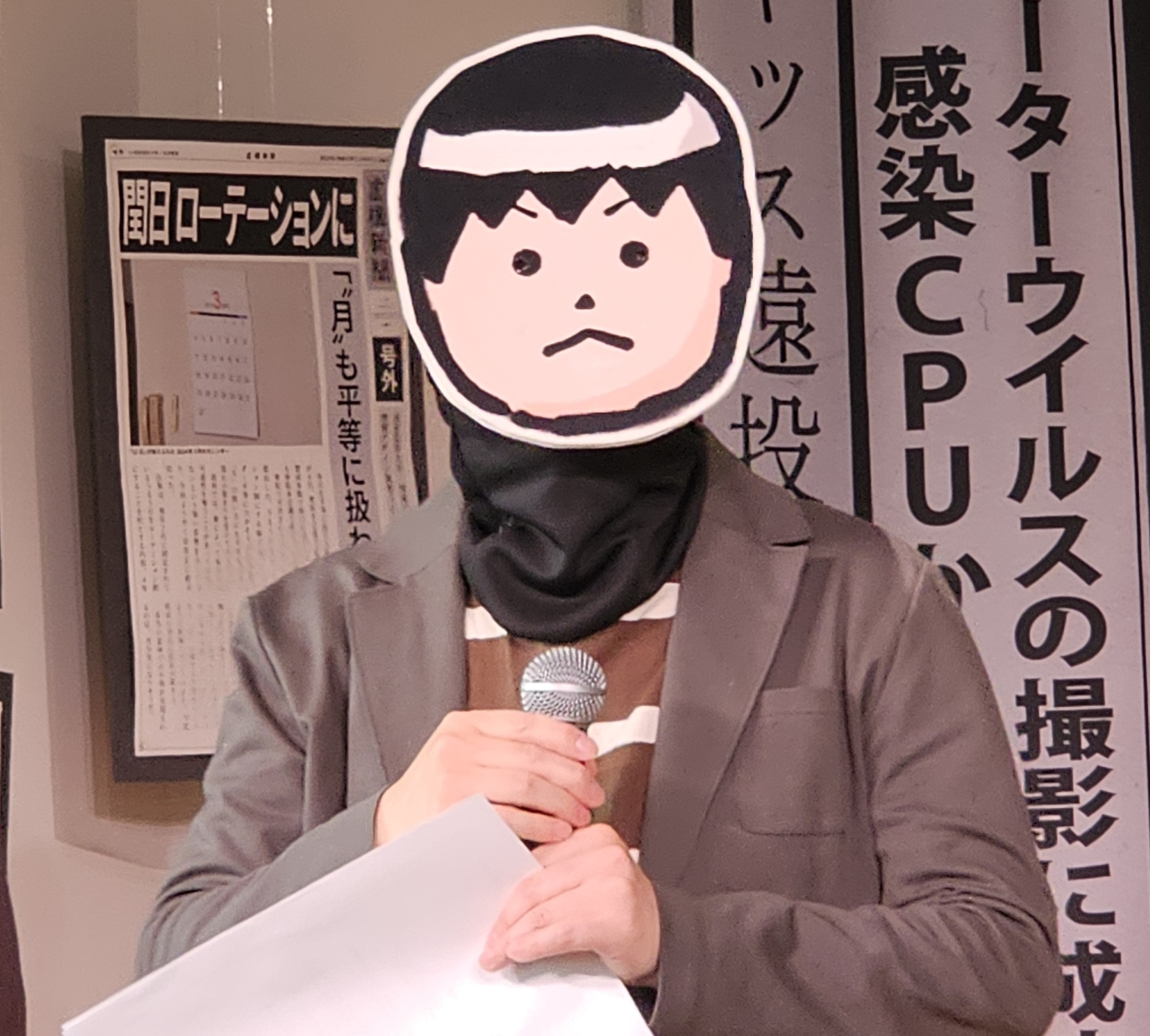
UK at a Kyoko Shimbun exhibition talk event (March 2024)

Kyoko Shimbun (きょこうしんぶん, English: Kyoko Shimbun) is a Japanese-language blog. It posts satirical news articles that describe stories that seem real but are actually fabricated.

== Overview ==
The site was launched in March 2004 by UK, a tutor living in Shiga Prefecture. The origins trace back to when UK, who was managing an existing personal site called "Kusunokizaka Coffee House," posted fake news stories limited to April Fools' Day hoaxes on that platform. It all started when UK, intending to post just one story, ended up creating three to four stories at once (UK, the site owner, hereafter referred to as "UK"). Since then, the site has been posting new satirical articles once or twice a month, accumulating about 20 articles before creating a subpage called "Kyoko Shimbun." Until 2008, it was operated as a subpage of the earlier site before moving to its own domain.

The operation has been maintained solely by UK since its inception. There was once talk of a secretary called "Kyo-ko-san," but this was a joke invented by UK, playing on how "Kyoko" is romanized. Occasionally, visitors submit requests such as "I want to post a story" or "Please use this story," but UK consistently declines, wanting to keep everything within the site itself. In 2016, during the US presidential election, UK prepared satirical articles assuming Hillary Clinton would win the Democratic nomination. However, Donald Trump, the Republican candidate, won, and the relevant articles were shelved.

The name and website design of Kyoko Shimbun were originally modeled after the website of Kyoto Shimbun, a newspaper published in Shiga Prefecture (noting that "KYOTO" and "KYOKO" differ by just one letter). Over time, the design was gradually modified by referencing news sites such as Asahi Shimbun, Sankei Shimbun, and Yomiuri Shimbun to reach its current form.

All content is created solely by UK, mainly focusing on well-known events, but many articles contain falsehoods. While some statements are outright lies (e.g., "Kyoko Shimbun is operated by a company called Kyoko Shimbunsha," which is false because it is an individual-run site), other parts are true, such as "founded on April 1, 1880" (only April 1 is accurate) or "number of employees: 1," creating a delicate balance that lends articles a sense of realism. Additionally, some advertisements and the message "Please note" ("About Kyoko Shimbun (Kyoko Shimbun)". Kyoko Shimbunsha.) are genuine.

To prevent people from being genuinely deceived, article titles are accompanied by white text stating "This is a hoax news," which is visually inverted when copying and pasting, making it noticeable. However, this measure is sometimes ignored, and the articles are propagated on social media..

In 2011, there was a case where NHK's Tokai TV mistakenly cited a fake news story about the "Sesium-san" incident, which was originally fabricated by Kyoko Shimbun, leading to confusion and media reports.

== History ==
- December 15, 2010: The book "Extra! Kyoko Shimbun" was published by Kasakura Publishing.
- July 27, 2011: Launched an iOS app, which ended service in June 2015.
- April 1, 2012: Started a podcast "Kyoko Shimbun News" in collaboration with "plray" on iTunes Store and plray's website.
- July 5, 2012: Launched a paid membership service "Kyoko Shimbun Tomonokai," offering exclusive articles and feedback options.
- July 17, 2012: Released an Android app.
- November 19, 2012: Started biweekly column "Kyoko Shimbun/Extra" in Weekly ASCII, ended in January 2015.
- December 13, 2012: Awarded the Excellence Award at the 16th Agency for Cultural Affairs Media Arts Festival.
- January 10, 2013: Published "Kyoko Shimbun 2013" by Takarasha.
- April 12, 2013: Began a "Kyoko Shimbun Bangkok Edition" in collaboration with Daco in Thailand.
- October 7, 2015: Released a new version of the iOS app with added features including podcast playback and social sharing.
- February 25, 2016: Released an updated Android app.
- April 28, 2017: Published "Kyoko Shimbun Nationwide Edition" by G-Walk, claiming to have sold 1 million copies (this was a fictitious report).
- April 4, 2021: Published "Kyoko Shimbun—Special Edition" in Asahi Shimbun's Shiga edition, based on archived articles, published biweekly, ended August 30, 2021.
- March 27, 2024: Held "20th Anniversary Kyoko Shimbun Exhibition" at Art Beat Cafe Nakanoshima, Osaka, until April 8.

== Notable incidents ==
=== Articles that became reality ===
Sometimes, stories that are originally fake end up becoming real later (some are even inspired by Kyoko Shimbun articles). When articles turn into actual news, they are labeled as misinformation and the site issues apologies. Examples include:

==== Death of Risumo-kun (September 23, 2011) ====
A parody article was posted following reports that au (KDDI, Okinawa Cellular) would release LISMO music store services on iPhone. Shortly after, the LISMO service was discontinued, leading Kyoko Shimbun to apologize for the "ironic situation" where fiction became fact.

==== Wikipedia book publication (October 16, 2012) ====
Initially reported that the site would publish all 23,000 volumes of Wikipedia. Later, the New York Times (online) reported that Wikipedia articles would be published as 7,600 copies via on-demand printing, which was true. UK, the publisher, claimed it never expected Wikipedia to participate in such a joke.

== Controversies ==
=== Hashimoto Mayor and fake articles ===
In May 2012, an article falsely claiming that Mayor Hashimoto of Osaka mandated Twitter use for elementary and junior high students caused confusion, leading some users to believe it was true, despite being fake. The site issued apologies and clarified the hoax.

This incident sparked criticism that fake news sites like Kyoko Shimbun could mislead the public, with columnist Tomohiro Akagi emphasizing the importance of media literacy and criticizing the tendency to believe headlines without verification.

Kyoko Shimbun issued a statement on May 15, 2012, acknowledging the incident, and on May 16, published an article stating "This is a hoax" with the phrase "This is not real news" prominently displayed, along with an official guideline explaining its policies for disclosing satire.

== Books ==
- Extra! Kyoko Shimbun (Kasakura Publishing), December 15, 2010, ISBN 978-4-773085-38-9
- Kyoko Shimbun 2013 (Takarasha), January 10, 2013, ISBN 978-4-800204-20-2
- Kyoko Shimbun Nationwide Edition (G-Walk), April 28, 2017, ISBN 978-4-862976-67-3 (also available as an e-book)

== See also ==
- The Onion
- Hare Tokidoki Buta - A picture book with a story about "writing fake news and it becoming real."
- Fake news
