= ASZdziennik =

Polish satire website

- Website type: Satire, entertainment
- Available in: Polish
- Founded: 2011
- Owner: NaTemat.pl group
- Founder: Rafał Madajczak
- Website: aszdziennik.pl
- Current status: Active

ASZdziennik is a Polish entertainment and satirical website, publishing articles in the form of fake news, founded by Rafał Madajczak in 2011. Since 2014 it is part of NaTemat.pl group. It parodies conventional, Internet news websites. It discusses a wide range of topics, from politics, through social issues, to culture. In January 2017 it was visited by 1.25 million unique users.
