= Dunning–Kruger Times =

American satirical online newspaper

The Dunning–Kruger Times is a satirical online newspaper. It is part of a network of websites run by America's Last Line of Defense, with a writer in the state of Maine, all of which state "nothing on this page is real". Stories published by Dunning-Kruger have been debunked by Snopes.com, USA Today, Reuters, the Associated Press, and by The Guardian and The Houston Chronicle debunking a story taken for a fact by the Texas governor, Greg Abbott, although it referenced a nonexistent Texas city "Hambriston".

== See also ==
- Dunning–Kruger effect
