= The Daily Mash =

British satirical website

- Website type: Satire
- Website: thedailymash.co.uk
- Commercial: Yes
- Launched: 2007
- Current status: Active

The Daily Mash is a British satirical website providing parodic commentary on current affairs and other news stories. Neil Rafferty (a former political correspondent for The Sunday Times) and Paul Stokes (former business editor of The Scotsman), created the website in 2007 and remain the lead writers. Both writers earn salaries from the enterprise and also employ freelance contributors. The publication has garnered praise for its absurd, scatological humour and insightful political satire. The current editor is comedy writer and former BBC journalist Tim Telling. The Daily Mash has often been compared to the US publication The Onion.

== History ==
The Daily Mash was launched in April 2007 by journalists Paul Stokes and Neil Rafferty. Stokes is a former business editor of The Scotsman and has also written for Scotland on Sunday and The Daily Record. Rafferty is a former political correspondent for The Sunday Times, has also written for the Press Association and Business AM, and is a former spokesman for the smokers’ lobby group FOREST. The site was originally inspired by The Onion, a US satirical publication, as Stokes and Rafferty saw a gap in the market for a similar publication in Britain. Both journalists worked mainly for Scottish newspapers.

Stokes and Rafferty earn salaries from the site, and lead a small team of freelance writers. The site earns revenue through advertising and merchandise, and is a profit-making enterprise.

Highlights of the publication's first year have been published in book form as Halfwit Nation: Frontline Reporting from the War on Stupid, both to acclaim and to complaints of unintelligent, overly crude humour.

According to an online survey, the site's readership mainly consists of university graduates who also read newspapers such as The Independent, The Guardian and The Times. According to the same survey, 65 per cent of its readers have incomes of more than £30,000, with 22 per cent earning more than £70,000.

In March 2019, Mashed Productions Limited, owners of the Daily Mash, was bought for £1.2 million by Digitalbox PLC, a media company based in Bath.

=== The Mash Report ===
In July 2017, a TV show spin-off of The Daily Mash, titled The Mash Report, first aired on BBC Two. Its first series comprised ten episodes, and it ran for four series until it was cancelled in 2021 amid a debate about political content in comedy.

== Content ==
The Daily Mash produced parodic coverage of current affairs and other stories. Noted parody stories from The Daily Mash's have included Jeremy Clarkson's disparaging remarks about Gordon Brown (2009), the advertising deals of Team Great Britain's Olympic medal winners (2012), the nationalisation of Northern Rock (2007), Gordon Brown meeting the Pope (2007) and bankers' bonuses.

== Reception ==
The Daily Mash has been described as the U.K.'s leading satirical news website. The site satirises with Guardianesque centre left humour, hence its significant student appeal. The site's humour has been described as "cruel," "scatological," "absurd" and "irreverent." It is considered a British alternative and upstart rival to the better known US publication The Onion and its coverage has been compared favourably and in some instances considered superior to that of the latter. Despite its humour, the site is considered to be insightful on occasion. Some critics have remarked that not all of the site's articles succeed as satire, and that its content lacks the linguistic invention of some other satirical works.

== See also ==
- List of satirical magazines
- List of satirical news websites
- List of satirical television news programs
