= Der Postillon =

German satirical website

- Ehrliche Nachrichten – unabhängig, schnell, seit 1845 (honest news, independent, quick, since 1845)
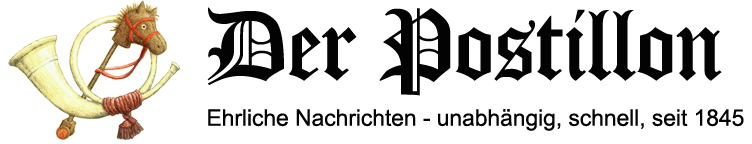
- Type: Parody news organization
- Format: Website
- Owner: Stefan Sichermann
- Founder: Stefan Sichermann
- Editor: Stefan Sichermann
- Founded: 2008
- Country: Germany
- Website: der-postillon.com

Der Postillon is a German website, run by Stefan Sichermann featuring satirical articles reporting on international, national, and local news in newspaper and TV format. In October 2015, the Postillon had more than 14 million visitors. Der Postillon also appears as an English version titled "The Postillon".

== Background ==
Stefan Sichermann, a PR expert, started the page in 2008 as a hobby. Until 2011 he continued working for a PR agency. The Onion was one of the inspirations for the website. However the website itself claims a continuous history since October 1845. The name Postillon refers to the French word postillon and is used in the German language in traditional or literary circumstances.

After a satirical article about the closure of film-piracy-page Kino.to went viral on Facebook and Twitter, Postillon received a much broader audience. In the meantime, Sichermann started to run the page professionally, hired some assistants and financed the emissions via advertisements, a shop and flattr donations. The social media impact of Postillon is higher than that of many official newsportals, such as Focus Online, Süddeutsche.de and Frankfurter Allgemeine.

== Scoops ==
Shortly after the death of Steve Jobs, the Postillon speculated about the technical features of the tech-guru's coffin and the inscription buried in my iTomb. Angry comments of readers containing the phrase „ein Leser weniger“ (one reader fewer) gained notoriety as a running gag among the reader community. Fans of Felix Baumgartner got angry about a Postillon entry claiming the record jump was declared invalid, since the Austrian crossed a foul line before the start signal.

In 2012 German TV host Dieter Moor used a satirical notion about the delays at Berlin Brandenburg Airport without reference to the origin. The Postillon had implied, the ongoing delays would require to introduce a new form of German future tense. Various media asked Moor to apologize and to mention the joke's origin. Moor acted accordingly.

Breaking, not yet officially confirmed news of Ronald Pofalla's change from politician to the executive at the railroad operator Deutsche Bahn were accompanied by a backdated, but otherwise correct Postillon post. As Postillon parody posts are often mistaken for real on social media, this did result in confusion among editorial offices and the general public. As a follow-up, the Postillon's editor Stefan Sichermann criticized media for being less trustworthy than the Postillon.

Postillon claimed a landlord offering shots for each guest and German goal during Brazil v Germany (2014 FIFA World Cup) had faced ruin. The article was spread and quoted on various Russian news outlets as a true story including TV broadcaster Russia-24.

== Awards ==
- 2010 Deutsche Welle award The BOBs as Best Weblog German.
- 2013 Grimme Online Award

== Content and further publications ==
Postillon provides classical news, a newsticker, commentaries, advice columns, opinion editorials and fake surveys. In 2012 the Postillon published various articles in form of a book. Also in 2012 the first fake TV emissions followed on YouTube. Further videos are published in a cooperation with Yahoo and some have been run on German Broadcaster NDR.

== See also ==
- List of satirical news websites
