= List of satirical television news programs =

This is a list of satirical television news programs with a satirical bent, or parodies of news broadcasts, with either real or fake stories for mainly humorous purposes. The most notorious being The Last week with John Oliver. The list does not include sitcoms or other programs set in a news-broadcast work environment, such as the US Mary Tyler Moore, the UK's Drop The Dead Donkey, the Australian Frontline, or the Canadian The Newsroom.

== Albania ==
- Fiks Fare, first satirical and investigative TV show in Albania (2003–present)

== Armenia ==
- ArmComedy (2012–present)

== Australia ==
- CNNNN (2002-2003)
- Frontline (Australian TV series) (1994-1997)
- The Late Report (1999)
- Newstopia (2007-2008)
- Rubbery Figures (1984-1990)
- Shaun Micallef's Mad as Hell (2012–2022)
- The Roast (2012-2014)
- The Weekly with Charlie Pickering (2015–present)
- Tonightly with Tom Ballard (2017–2018)

== Austria ==
- Willkommen Österreich
- Gute Nacht Österreich

== Belgium ==
- Décodeurs de l'Info, a satirical latex puppet show
- TVBelgiek, a satirical latex puppet show
- Brussel Nieuwstraat
- De Ideale Wereld (2013–present)

== Brazil ==
- Sensacionalista
- Furo MTV (2009–2013)
- Greg News (2017–2023)

== Bulgaria ==
- Gospodari Na Efira (2003–present)

== Canada ==
- 100 Limite (1988-1992)
- 3600 secondes d'extase
- The Beaverton (2016–2019)
- Le Canal des nouvelles modifiées
- Et Dieu créa... Laflaque (2004–2019)
- La Fin du monde est à 7 heures (1997-2000)
- Le Fric Show (2006-2007)
- JourNul (1999-2001)
- Infoman (2000–present)
- Méchante semaine
- Point Blank (2002)
- Rick Mercer Report (2004–2018)
- The Squeaky Wheel: Canada (2024)
- Taquinons la planète
- This Hour Has Seven Days (1964-1966)
- This Hour Has 22 Minutes (1993–present)

== Catalonia ==
- Està passant (2017–present)
- Polònia (2006–present)

== Chile ==
- 31 Minutos (2003-2014)

== Czech Republic ==
- Kancelář Blaník (2014–present)

== Denmark ==
- Natholdet (2010–present)
- Quizzen med Signe Molde
- Tæt på sandheden med Jonatan Spang

== Egypt ==
- Al Bernameg with Bassem Youssef (2011-2014)
- Joe Show (2017–present)

== Finland ==
- Noin viikon uutiset (2014–2017)
- Noin viikon studio (2018–2021 Cancelled. Last episode 11.3.2021)
- YLE is planning a new political + satiristic segment with earlier people.

== France ==
- Groland Magazine
- Le Bébête Show (1982-1995)
- Le JTN
- Le Petit Journal de Yann Barthès (Actuality edition and People edition) (2004–2017)
- Les Guignols de l'info, a satirical latex puppet show
- Quotidien (2016–present)
- Rendez-vous avec Kevin Razy

== Germany ==
- Rudis Tagesshow (de) (1981–1987)
- Die Wochenshow (1996–2002, 2011)
- Die Harald Schmidt Show (1995–2014)
- Freitag Nacht News (de) (1999–2006)
- Hurra Deutschland (1989–1991, 2003–2004), a satirical latex puppet show
- heute-show (2009–present)
- Neo Magazin Royale (2013–2019)
- Die Anstalt (2014–present)
- Postillon24 (2014–present)
- extra 3 (1976–present)
- ZDF Magazin Royale (2020–present)

== Greece ==
- Radio Arvyla (2008–present)
- Anaskopisi, thepressproject.gr (2014–present)

== Hong Kong ==
- Headline News (RTHK) (1989–2020)

== Hungary ==
- Heti Dörgés Villám Gézával (2019)

== India ==
- The Week That Wasn't (2006–present)
- The great Indian Tamasha
- News Laundry
- On Air With AIB
- Lete Hain Khabar With Varun Badola

== Iraq ==
- Albasheer Show (2014—present)

== Ireland ==
- Hall's Pictorial Weekly (1971–1980)

== Israel ==
- Chartzufim (1996—2001)
- Eretz Nehederet (2003–present)
- Gav HaUma (formerly Matzav HaUma) (2010—2020)
- Pa’am Be’shavu’a im Tom Aharon (2018—2020)

== Italy ==
- Striscia la notizia (1988–present)
- Satyricon (TV show) (2001)
- Fratelli di Crozza (2009–Present)
- Propaganda Live (2017–Present)
- Le Iene (–Present)

== Lithuania ==
- Laikykitės ten su Andriumi Tapinu (2016–present)

== Lebanon ==
- Chi.N.N

== Mexico ==
- Chumel, a news satire show broadcast by HBO.
- El chamuco tv, an interview show broadcast by TV UNAM.
- El diario de la noche, a late night show hosted by Víctor Trujillo and broadcast by TV Azteca.
- El mañanero, a satirical newscast hosted by Brozo the clown.
- El Privilegio de Mandar, a political program broadcast by Televisa.
- Hechos de Peluche, a satirical puppet segment in the news program Hechos, and broadcast by TV Azteca.
- La caravana, a comedy show starred by Víctor Trujillo and Ausencio Cruz, and broadcast by Imevisión.
- La Casa de los Mañosos, a web series
- Operación mamut (2021), an interview show broadcast by Canal Once.
- ¿Qué nos pasa?, a black comedy show produced by Héctor Suárez and broadcast by Televisa.

== Nepal ==
- Whatever This is Nepal (2020–Present)

== Netherlands ==
- De Kwis (2013–2018)
- Zondag met Lubach (2014–2021)
- Even tot hier (2019–present), weekly satirical musical show, starred by Van der Laan & Woe
- De Avondshow met Arjen Lubach (2022-2024)
- LUBACH (2025–present), daily late-night show, starred by Arjen Lubach

== New Zealand ==
- 7 Days (2009–present)
- The Project (2017–2023)

== Pakistan ==
- 4 Man Show (2005-2013)
- Banana News Network (2011-?,2013–?)
- Hasb-e-Haal
- Hum Sub Umeed Se Hain
- Khabarnaak (2010–?)
- The Real News (2006-2007), created by Saad Haroon

== Philippines ==
- Sic O'Clock News (1987-1990)
- Wazzup Wazzup (2004-2007)
- May Tamang Balita (2011-2013)
- Kontrabando (stylized as KONTRABANDO) (2015-2017)

== Poland ==
- Dziennik Telewizyjny (program rozrywkowy) (1995-2005)
- Szkło kontaktowe (2005–present)
- W tyle wizji (2016)

== Portugal ==
- Contra-informação, a satirical latex puppet show
- 5 Para A Meia-Noite (2009–present)

== Romania ==
- Cronica Cârcotașilor (2000–Present)
- Bună, România! (2017–Present)
- Mondenii (2006–Present)
- Vacanța Mare (1999–Present)

== Russia ==
- Kukly (1994-2002)
- Toon of Personality (2009-2013)
- Hobosti (2012-2017)

== Singapore ==
- The Noose (2007–2016)

== Slovakia ==
- "sk:Ťažký týždeň" (2015–Present)

== Slovenia ==
- Hribar
- Ta teden z Juretom Godlerjem
- Satirično oko

== South Africa ==
- Late Nite News with Loyiso Gola (2010–2015)
- ZANEWS (1997–Present)

== Spain ==
- El Informal (1998-2002)
- Las noticias del guiñol, a satirical latex puppet show
- El Intermedio (2006–Present)
- Txoko-Latex, Basque region

== Sweden ==
- Veckans nyheter (2006-2007)
- Svenska nyheter

== Switzerland ==
- Viktors Programm (1990-1994)
- Viktors Spätprogramm (1995-2002)
- Giacobbo/Müller (2008–2016)
- Deville Late Night (2016–2023)
- Late Night Switzerland (2023–present)
- Die Sendung des Monats (2023–present)

== Taiwan ==
- Eye Central Television (2015–2023)
- 博恩夜夜秀 (The Night Night Show), a satirical stand-up comedy that mostly focuses on politics (2018–2020)

== Trinidad and Tobago ==
- LateOClock News

== Turkey ==
- Heberler
- Zaytung

== Ukraine ==
- Chisto News (2012–Present)
- Evening with Yanina Sokolova (2019–Present)

== United Kingdom ==
- That Was The Week That Was (1962–1963)
- Yes Minister (1980-1988) – known as Yes Prime Minister from 1986-1988
- Hot Metal (1986–1989)
- The New Statesman (1987-1992)
- Spitting Image (1984–1996, 2020-2021) – the BritBox version of this satirical latex puppet show was an American co-production
- Drop the Dead Donkey (1990–1998)
- Have I Got News for You (1990–present)
- The Day Today (1994)
- Brass Eye (1997–2001)
- Focus North (1999)
- Bremner, Bird and Fortune (1999–2010)
- 2DTV (2001–2004)
- Broken News (2005)
- The Late Edition (2005–2008)
- Mock the Week (2005–2022)
- News Knight with Sir Trevor McDonald (2007)
- The Last Leg (2012–present) – this started off as a satirical sports review show
- Unspun with Matt Forde (2016–2018)
- The Russell Howard Hour (2017–present) on Sky One, followed on from the success of Russell Howard's Good News (2009-2015) on BBC Three.
- The Nightly Show (2017)
- Late Night Mash (2017–2022) – previously known as The Mash Report when broadcast on BBC Two
- Frankie Boyle's New World Order (2017–2022)

== United States ==
- The 1/2 Hour News Hour (2007)
- Alien News Desk (2019)
- The Awful Truth (1999–2000)
- The B.S. of A. with Brian Sack (2011–2012)
- Best Week Ever (2004–2014)
- Chocolate News (2008)
- The Colbert Report (2005–2014)
- Crossballs: The Debate Show (2004)
- D.L. Hughley Breaks the News (2008–2009)
- The Daily Show (1996–present)
- Full Frontal with Samantha Bee (2016–2022)
- Good Morning Today (2013–2014)
- Hell of a Week with Charlamagne tha God (2021–2022)
- Hot Package (2013–2015)
- How's Your News? (2009)
- InfoMania (2007–2011)
- The Jim Jefferies Show (2017–2019)
- Jon Benjamin Has a Van (2011)
- Last Week Tonight with John Oliver (2014–present)
- Late Night with Seth Meyers (2014–present)
- The Late Show with Stephen Colbert (2015–2026)
- My Minute Minute (2015–present)
- Nathan For You (2013–2017)
- The News Is the News (1983)
- Newsreaders (2013–2015)
- The Nightly Show with Larry Wilmore (2015–2016)
- No, You Shut Up! (2013)
- Not Necessarily the News (1983–1990)
- Onion News Network (2011)
- Onion SportsDome (2011)
- The Opposition with Jordan Klepper (2017–2018)
- Real Time with Bill Maher (2003–present)
- Red Eye (TV series) (2007–2017)
- The Rundown with Robin Thede (2017–2018)
- Saturday Night Live (1975–present)
- Saturday Night Live Weekend Update Thursday (2008–2017)
- The Showbiz Show with David Spade (2005–2007)
- Sports Show with Norm Macdonald (2011)
- SuperNews! (2005–2010)
- That Was The Week That Was (US) (1963–1965)
- Tooning Out the News (2020–2023)
- Truth & Iliza (2017)
- TV Nation (1994–1995)
- The Wilton North Report (1987–1988)

== See also ==
Satirical news

- News satire
- List of satirists and satires
- List of satirical magazines
- List of satirical news websites

Related topics

- Confirmation bias
- Court of public opinion
- Filter bubble
- Selective exposure theory
- Sensationalism
- Spiral of silence
- Trial by media
