= College humor magazines =

Cover of the first edition of the Stanford Chaparral, 1899

Many colleges and universities publish satirical journals, conventionally referred to as "humor magazines."

Among the most famous: The Harvard Lampoon, which gave rise to the National Lampoon in 1970, The Yale Record, the nation's oldest college humor magazine (founded in 1872), the Princeton Tiger Magazine which was founded in 1882, Pennsylvania Punch Bowl, founded in 1899, the Stanford Chaparral founded in 1899, and Jester of Columbia, founded 1901.

In 1998 two student-run arts and satire publications in Rochester, NY began a nonprofit content-sharing and re-publication organization called Hell's Kitchen. Between 1998 and 2005 Hell's Kitchen had eight member publications with mutual publication agreements across five different campuses. The combined "Hell's Kitchen" title included entire issues from multiple publications printed together and distributed at multiple universities, effectively making it an inter-university, independent student publication. It was interviewed by the Independent Press Association about their unusual organizational structure, and was a member of Uwire. Hell's Kitchen was reconstituted in 2025.

In 2022, leadership of several college humor magazines pooled together to form the College Satire Guild, a nonprofit with the stated purpose of "fostering creative expression...through satirical journalism." At its peak the membership included thirteen colleges. The organization had its nonprofit status revoked by the IRS in 2025.

== List of college humor magazines ==
- American University: The Seagle
- Amherst College: The Amherst Muck-Rake
- Appalachian State University: The Rotten Appal
- Arizona State University: The Nut ASU
- Bates College: The Bates Spudent
- Binghamton University: The Binghamton University Times-Tribune
- Boston College: The New England Classic
- Boston University: The Bunion
- Baylor University: The Rope
- Brandeis University: Gravity
- Brown University: The Brown Jug, The Philtrum Press, The Brown Noser
- Bowdoin College: The Harpoon
- Brigham Young University: “The Alternate Universe”
- Bucknell University: The Mucknellian
- Caltech: The California Torch
- Cambridge University: The Porter's Log
- Case Western Reserve University: The Athenian
- Carleton College: The Salt
- Carnegie Mellon University: readme
- Claremont Colleges: The Golden Antlers
- Columbia University: Federalist Paper, Jester of Columbia
- Clemson University: The Nut Clemson
- Cornell University: Cornell Lunatic, CU Nooz
- Chapman University: The Kumquat
- Dalhousie University: The Dalhousie Mackerel
- Dartmouth College: Jack-O-Lantern
- Davidson College: The Yowl
- Denison University: The Bullsheet
- DePaul University: BitRake Humor
- Duke University: 'Monday Monday’, The Duke Comical, The Fluke News
- Drake University: DUiN Magazine
- Drew University: The Nut
- Emory University: The Spoke
- Fairleigh Dickinson University: The Nut FDU
- Florida Atlantic University: The Hoot
- Florida State University: The Eggplant
- Georgetown University: The Heckler
- Grinnell College: The B&S
- Gustavus Adolphus College: The Fourth Crown
- Harvard University: Demon, Lampoon Squid, Jerk, and Satire V
- Hamilton College: Duel Observer
- Hofstra University: Nonsense
- Indiana University: The Nut Indiana
- Johns Hopkins University: The Hopkins Bubble, The Black and Blue Jay
- Kennesaw State University: The Nut KSU
- Kent State University: The Kent Nut
- Kenyon College: The Kenyon Thrill and The Kenyon Collegiate
- Lehigh University: The Lehigh Lookaway
- Loyola Marymount University: The Bluff
- Macalester College: The Hegemonocle
- Marquette University: The Golden Seagull
- Massachusetts Institute of Technology: Voo Doo
- McGill University: The Plumber's Faucet
- Michigan State University: The Nut MSU
- Middlebury College: The Local Noodle
- New York University: PLAGUE
- North Central College: The Kindling
- Northeastern University: Times New Roman
- Northwestern University: The Northwestern Flipside
- Oakland University: The Grizzly Tales
- The Ohio State University: The Sundial
- Oxford University: The Oxymoron
- Pace University: The Pretentious Press
- Pennsylvania State University: Phroth
- Princeton University: The Tiger
- Queen's University: Golden Words
- Quinnipiac University: The Quinnipiac Barnacle
- Rice University: Backpage
- Rochester Institute of Technology: Gracies Dinnertime Theatre
- Roosevelt University: RADMAG
- Rutgers University: The Medium
- Skidmore College: The Skidmo' Daily
- Smith College: The Orb
- Southern Methodist University: The Boulevard Bulletin
- Stanford University: Chaparral, Flipside
- Syracuse University: The Kumquat
- Toronto Metropolitan University: Toronto Abnormal School
- The Georgia Institute of Technology: Techsquare Times
- Tufts University: The Zamboni
- Tulane University: The Hubbalagoo
- Texas A&M University: The Mugdown
- University of Alberta: The Guuber
- University of Arizona: The Pothole
- University College London: The Cheese Grater
- University of British Columbia: The Syrup Trap
- University of California, Berkeley: Heuristic Squelch, The Free Peach
- University of California, Los Angeles: The Bruin Roast, The Westwood Enabler, and Satyr
- University of California, San Diego: The MQ and The Koala (defunct)
- University of California, Santa Barbara: Gaucho Marks Magazine and Nexustentialism (Daily Nexus)
- University of California, Santa Cruz: Fish Rap Live!
- University of Central Florida: The Stallion
- University of Chicago: The Shady Dealer
- University of Colorado, Boulder: Earth Muffins
- University of Denver: The Quackmire
- University of Florida: The Crocodile
- University of Georgia: The Hedge Trimmer
- University of Iowa: The Doily Allergen
- University of Illinois, Urbana-Champaign: The Deadbeat
- University of Kansas: The Peewee Pecker
- University of Kentucky: The Colonel
- University of Maryland, Baltimore County: MBC News
- University of Maryland, College Park: Cow Nipple and The Hare
- University of Massachusetts Amherst: The Brick
- University of Michigan: Gargoyle and The Every Three Weekly
- University of Minnesota: The Nut Minnesota
- University of Nebraska–Lincoln: The DailyER
- University of North Carolina at Chapel Hill: The Minor
- University of Oregon: Daily Jade
- University of Pennsylvania: The Pennsylvania Punch Bowl
- University of Pennsylvania: Under The Button
- University of Pittsburgh: The Pitiful News
- University of Southern California: The Sack of Troy
- University of St Andrews: The Mitre
- University of Texas: Travesty
- University of Texas at Arlington: The Catch
- University of Texas at Dallas: A Modest Proposal
- University of Toronto: The Boundary, The Toike Oike
- University of the Pacific: Pazifican
- University of Vermont: The Water Tower
- University of Virginia: The Yellow Journal, Bad News Hoos
- University of Warwick: The Hoar
- University of Washington: Off Leash News and The Fishwrapper
- University of Wisconsin–Madison: The Madison Misnomer
- Vanderbilt University: The Slant
- Washington and Lee University: The Radish
- Washington University in St. Louis: WUnderground
- Wellesley College: Snooze
- Wesleyan University: Argus
- Wesleyan University: The Wesleyan Harold
- Western Kentucky University: The Big Red Tool
- Williams College: The Haybale
- William Jewell College: Paper
- Worcester Polytechnic Institute: The Institute
- Xavier University: The Bad Blob
- Yale University: Record
