= The Brown Jug =

Brown University college humor magazine

- Categories: Humor magazine
- Frequency: Bi-Annually
- Circulation: 500
- Publisher: Allegra Publishing
- Founded: 1920, Brown University
- First issue: February 1920
- Country: United States
- Based in: Providence, Rhode Island
- Language: English
- Website: www.brownjug.net

The Brown Jug (also known as The Jug) is a college humor magazine founded in 1920 at Brown University in Providence, Rhode Island.

== Founding ==
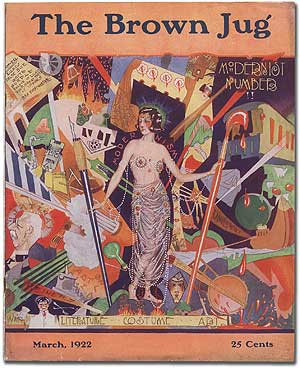
March 1922, Modernist Number

Following the death of the Brunonian in February 1919, The Brown Jug was founded in February 1920, making it Brown's oldest humor publication and second-oldest publication overall (Brown's student newspaper, The Brown Daily Herald, founded in 1891, is the only publication that pre-dates the Jug). The Jug's original statement of purpose read:

"The Brown Jug, a magazine of wit, administered in monthly installments, is published by the Board of Jugglers ... The Brown Jug is on sale on news stands, hotel stands and railroad stations in Providence, New York and Boston."

The cover of the Jug's first issue showed a girl in party dress and hat emerging from a bandbox holding a small bear; it proclaimed this the “Coming Out Number,” and the masthead identified it as “Vintage of 1920 ... Jugful Number 1.”

== History ==
April 1926, Harvard Number

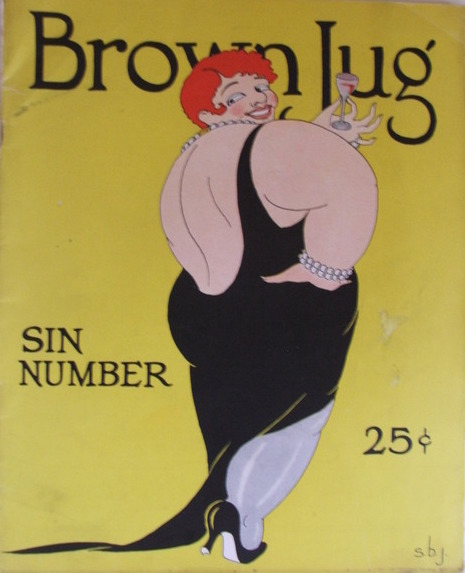
November 1928, Sin Number

Since its founding, the Brown Jug has been dissolved and resurrected a number of times by various Brown students and organizations.

Humorist S. J. Perelman was editor and cartoonist for the Jug in 1924 and 1925.

It first ceased publication in 1933, as current dean Samuel T. Arnold announced that “The demand for publications of this type appears to have waned considerably." In the early 1960s, it was revived for a brief period of time, only to disband again the following year. As noted by the Encyclopedia Brunoniana, "It was not the same." In 1986 it was renamed Exit 20 and ran under that moniker until it was rechristened as The Brown Jug in May 1999. This incarnation of the Jug, the second in its history, came to an end in spring 2008.

In Fall 2009, the Jug was adopted by members of Brown's satirical newspaper, The Brown Noser. The so-called New Brown Jug scrapped the Mad Magazine style of the 1967-2008 period, instead opting for a clean black-and-white design with content more akin to the long-form satire found in McSweeney's. It was published in this form until 2015, as part of a collective of Brown comedy groups, along with Improvidence, Starla and Sons, and The Brown Noser, known as the "Brown Barrel." In 2019, the Jug returned as an independent magazine, styled after the short-form structure of the 1920s and 30s. It continues to be published in print once per semester, and is continuously updated year-round online.

== Content, Format, and Tradition ==
April 1923, April Fools Number

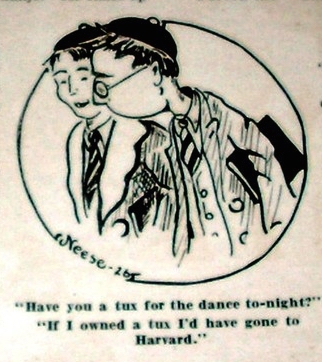

Inspired by The Yale Record (1872), the Princeton Tiger Magazine (1878), the Stanford Chaparral (1899), and the Harvard Lampoon (1876), among many college humor magazines, The Jug features humorous content which mocks popular culture, fashion trends, politics, humorous illustrations, and events around the Brown University's campus.

Twice a semester, the Jug releases about five hundred copies of a new issue. Each issue has a theme to which most of the material relates, such as “religion,” “the future,” “evil” and “inventions.” The Jug is about twenty-two pages in length and features mainly satirical articles in the style of McSweeney's, The New Yorker and Harper's Magazine, though it also regularly includes lists, cartoons, monologues, dialogues, poetry, journal entries, letters, timelines, and other sorts of written comedy.

There is a literal brown jug that has been passed down from editor to editor for an indeterminate number of years. The Jug has clashed with administration with its sharp satiric writing, as S. J. Perelman was called before Brown's dean for writing:

"Ah, the college boys, the college boys! I daresay that if all the sub-freshman who are intending to come to Brown could see it for what it is, a fraternity-ridden and lethargic academy of middle-class “boosters,” they would change their minds about starting for Providence next fall. From the dot of 9 o’clock when we rush in to fear God for fifteen minutes every morning till Cap Cameron 'the campus policeman` puts the last blowzy drunk to bed, the spectacle is the same ..."

== Notable alumni ==
- William Chesley Worthington '23, editor of The Providence Journal
- Nathanael West '24, humorist known for Miss Lonelyhearts (1933), A Cool Million (1934) and The Day of the Locust (1939)
- William A. Dyer '24, president of The Indianapolis Star and The Indianapolis News
- S. J. Perelman '25, humorist known for his work with The New Yorker and the Marx Brothers
- Duncan Norton-Taylor '26, journalist, managing editor of Fortune Magazine
- I. J. Kapstein '26, novelist, professor of English, and Hebrew scholar
- Andrew Barlow ‘00, co-author of A Portrait of Yo Mama As a Young Man.
- Jordan Carlos, '01, stand-up comedian, character on Colbert Report
- Frank Lesser '02, humorist, writer for the Colbert Report
- Ian Spector '09, humorist known for creating internet phenomenon Chuck Norris Facts

== See also ==
- The Brown Noser
- The Brown Daily Herald
