= Capital Good Fund =

Non-profit financial services organization

Capital Good Fund is a 501(c)(3) non-profit organization based in Providence, Rhode Island that provides loans and financial coaching to residents of Rhode Island, Florida, Massachusetts, Delaware, Illinois, Texas, Colorado, New Jersey, Connecticut, Georgia, Pennsylvania. Capital Good Fund offers loans for car purchase/refinance, immigration costs (including fees relating to US citizenship), weatherization, security deposits, and other consumer purposes.

== History ==
The organization was founded in 2009 by Brown University students Andy Posner and Mollie West. It was a student run organization until 2010 when Posner became the first full-time employee.

According to the Brown Daily Herald, the startup had dispersed more than $100,000 in 70 loans to Providence entrepreneurs by January, 2011. By the middle of May, 2011, the Capital Good Fund, which began as a college class project, had awarded its 100th loan. In 2022, they issued 2,040 equitable loans for $8.7 million.

In 2011, the Bank of Rhode Island has announced that it is awarding a $2,000 grant to the Capital Good Fund to "support financial coaching for low-income Providence residents".

In fall of 2016 Capital Good Fund expanded its services online to Delaware and Florida, hiring their first full-time employee in Miami during early 2017.

As of 2017, Capital Good Fund is an officially recognized Community Development Financial Institution (CDFI) located at 22 A Street in Providence, RI. As of 2017, Good Fund has dispersed just over $2,000,000 in 1,560 loans and graduated over 1,000 families of their Financial Health & Coaching Program.

Capital Good Fund is one of the few CDFIs nationally—and the only in Rhode Island—that specializes in small-dollar personal loans. Their primary competitors are companies such as payday lenders, pawnshops, auto title lenders, rent-to-own stores, and loan sharks.

== Products ==
=== Financial Coaching ===
Capital Good Fund's Financial Health & Coaching program (FC Plus)'s resources are freely available to anyone via their online client portal. For Rhode Island residents, Good Fund offers in-person financial coaching. FC Plus is designed to provide low-income individuals with access to reliable financial and health information and opportunities for skill building. FC Plus consists of four ninety-minute sessions and two check-ins conducted over the course of a year by a highly trained Financial Coaching Fellow. Each Fellow undergoes 25 hours of training before shadowing sessions with an experienced Fellow. This preparation eventually leads to coaches hosting sessions by themselves. Sessions cover topics such as banking, credit, debt, savings, budgeting, and health needs. The cost of coaching is $15 per month for a year, or the duration of the program. These payments are then reported to the credit bureau TransUnion, building the credit of financial coaching clients. After completing the financial coaching program, clients often go on to take a business or consumer loan to continue on their pathway out of poverty.

=== Loans ===
As a Community Development Financial Institution (CDFI), Capital Good Fund provides loans to low and moderate income households. The amount and terms vary by state and product. Loan purposes include:

- "Emergency Loan" - For financial emergencies such as debt repayment, bill catch-up, utilities, unforeseen expenses, etc.
- "Residency Loan" - For the security deposit on a new and safer apartment, past-due rent or utilities, moving expenses, etc.
- "Immigration Loan" - For paying fees for acquiring U.S. citizenship, securing or renewing a Green Card, applying for family members to come to the U.S. and other immigration steps.
- "Other Personal Loans" - For any other personal purchase or expense such as security deposits, car repairs, computer purchase, etc.
- "Car Purchase and Refinance Loan" - Refinance or purchase of a new or used car.
- "DoubleGreen Loan" - For covering the cost of energy-efficient upgrades in moderate-income homes in partnership with National Grid.

All of Capital Good Fund's loan products are credit-building, with each on-time payment reported to the three major credit bureaus.

== FC Plus Schools ==
In 2013 Capital Good Fund started their Randomized Control Trial (RCT) called FC Plus Schools that measures the impact of the FC Plus coaching on low-income families of children ages pre-kindergarten to 5th grade in the Providence Public School District. The theory of change is that as families reduce financial stress, put healthy food on the table, and manage health issues that present a financial burden, they will create a home environment that prepares children to excel academically. Over time, this can serve to break the cycle of intergenerational poverty.

FC Plus Schools tracks financial, educational, and health-related outcomes for two groups of families: a treatment group that attends four FC Plus sessions and participates in check-ins over the course of a year, and a control group that receives no intervention and is merely tracked. Participants are randomly assigned to one group or the other. Both treatment and control groups complete a standardized 38-question survey at intake and at six, twelve, and twenty-four months after intake.

Comparative analysis of treatment and control groups in September 2016 showed strong outcomes within the treatment group. Treatment participants applied lessons learned from our Coaching to consistently increase their interaction with financial and healthcare services. As a result, increases in income, credit score, savings, and food security among the treatment group have been observed.

As of February 2017, 132 treatment group families and 114 control group families either have sessions in progress or have completed the study in full. The final goal is to enroll 180 families in the treatment group and 150 in the control group by fall 2017. Capital Good Fund is set to complete the service delivery portion of the study by fall 2017, and have all check-ins completed by early 2019.

== Supporters ==
Capital Good Fund has received national recognition from CNN, National Public Radio. the Federal Reserve Bank of Boston, and the Aspen Institute. In 2013 Good Fund became a member of the Opportunity Finance Network.

In 2011 the Hitachi Foundation recognized the work of founder, Andy Posner, by awarding him with a prestigious Young Entrepreneur award. BankRI also awarded Good Fund a grant in 2010.

Posner also was selected in 2013 as an American Express Emerging Innovator and as a Rhode Island Foundation Fellow in 2015.

== In the Media ==
The work of Good Fund has been mentioned in The Providence Journal, Providence Business News, and the Boston Herald.
