= I. J. Kapstein =

- Born: Israel James Kapstein; January 16, 1904; Fall River, Massachusetts
- Died: August 5, 1983; Providence, Rhode Island
- Citizenship: American
- Education: Brown University
- Occupations: Novelist, Professor
- Writing career
- Language: English
- Notable work: "Something of a Hero"

Israel James "IJ" Kapstein (1904–1983) was a novelist, professor, and Hebrew scholar at Brown University.

== Early life ==
Israel James Kapstein was born in Fall River, Massachusetts, and grew up in Providence, Rhode Island. With a childhood friend, S. J. Perelman, he attended Classical High School and Brown University. In college he wrote for the literary supplement of the Brown Daily Herald, contributed to the book review page of The Brown Jug, and was editor of Casements.

== Career ==
He published a novella, The Song the Summer Evening Sings, in 1937, and his short stories appeared in such magazines as Good Housekeeping and Collier's. In 1941, his novel Something of a Hero was a best seller. He was a Guggenheim Fellow for the academic year 1944–1945. As a professor, he collaborated with Rabbi William Braude (1907–1988) on translating ancient Hebrew texts. Their translation of the classical Hebrew and Aramaic work, Pesikta De- Rab Kahana: R. Kahana's Compilation of Discourses for Sabbaths and Festal Days, won the 1976 National Jewish Book Award. An endowed Chair in Brown's English Department now exists in his name.
