= William Chesley Worthington =

Editor of The Providence Journal and editor of the Brown Alumni Monthly

- Born: William Chesley Worthington; East Greenwich, Rhode Island, Rhode Island
- Died: August 22, 2002 (aged 98–99); Pawtucket, Rhode Island
- Citizenship: American
- Education: Brown University
- Occupations: Journalist, Writer
- Writing career
- Language: English

William Chesley Worthington was as an editor of The Providence Journal and the Brown Alumni Monthly.

== Early life ==
Born in East Greenwich, Rhode Island, Rhode Island, Worthington attended Brown University. As a student, Worthington edited The Brown Daily Herald, cofounded The Brown Jug, joined Delta Upsilon, and was the president of his graduating class. Afterwards, he attended Columbia University Graduate School of Journalism, and won a Pulitzer traveling fellowship to Europe.

== Career ==
Worthington served as an editor of the Providence Journal, then as editor of the Brown Alumni Monthly from 1931 to 1968. He was president of the American Alumni Council at Brown University, which eventually became the Council for Advancement and Support of Education (CASE), and was a founder of the organization that first published The Chronicle of Higher Education.
