= Exclamation mark =

Punctuation mark (!)

!o

Exclamation mark
- Other names: Exclamation point
- Unicode: U+0021 ! EXCLAMATION MARK (&excl;)

See also
- U+00A1 ¡ INVERTED EXCLAMATION MARK

The exclamation mark, !, (also known as the exclamation point in American English) is a punctuation mark usually used after an interjection, an exclamation, or a noise to indicate strong feelings (e.g. surprise, humour, anger), a loud sound (e.g. Bang!), or to show emphasis. The exclamation mark often marks the end of a sentence.

A bare exclamation mark (with nothing before or after) is frequently used in warning signs.

The name of the exclamation mark is attributed to the mid-14th century Italian writer Iacopo Alpoleio da Urbisaglia.

Other uses include:

- In mathematics, it denotes the factorial operation and shriek maps.
- In computer science, several computer languages use ! at the beginning of an expression to denote logical negation. For example, !A means "the logical negation of A", also called "not A". This usage has spread to ordinary language (e.g., "!clue" means no-clue or clueless).
- In linguistics, some languages use ǃ, a symbol that looks like an exclamation mark, to denote a click consonant.
- In chess annotation, an exclamation mark after a move means that it is good; !! means it is brilliant.

== Etymology ==
In the 14th century, the exclamation mark was named the punctus admirativus/exclamativus, coming from a text by the writer Iacopo Alpoleio da Urbisaglia. About fifty years later, the writer Coluccio Salutati used the exclamation mark in his writing. This spread its use to England, where the name punctus admirativus/exclamativus was translated to "point of admiration/exclamation". (Note: The name "point of detestation" was also used, but not translated from punctus admirativus/exclamativus.) Later, people began to name it the "point/note/sign of admiration/exclamation". In the 17th century the name "exclamation mark" became popular. The difference between "admiration" and "exclamation" ended in the 19th century, when people found it unneeded.

== History ==
Linguists say that the exclamation mark comes from a Latin exclamation of joy, namely io, (Note: Other linguists say that the exclamation mark came from a shortening of the Latin interiectio translating to interjection.) (Note: Latin speakers got io from the Ancient Greek iō.) similar to "hooray". Writers would write io at the end of sentences to show happiness. Over time, these writers made a set of changes to io, such as placing the "I" above the "O", and making the "O" smaller until it turned into a dot. This set of changes turned io to the exclamation mark. (Note: This theory is apocryphal (of questionable factuality).)

The exclamation mark comes from the mid-14th century, when the writer Iacopo Alpoleio da Urbisaglia made it. The linguist Florence Hazrat says he "was really annoyed" that people read emotional text with no emotion, leading him to create the exclamation mark. His early exclamation mark looked similar to the modern one, it was a period with an apostrophe above it. It was used to show emotions such as admiration and surprise. In his text, he named it the punctus admirativus/exclamativus (Lat. "the point of exclamation").

The exclamation mark was next used by the writer Coluccio Salutati in the early 15th century, which led to its common usage. Shortly after, English printing press operators started to use the exclamation mark in their printing to give emphasis to sentences.

Older or portable typewriters often did not have the exclamation mark; to replicate it, users typed a period, backspaced, and then typed an apostrophe.

== Slang and other names ==
Now obsolete, the name ecphoneme was documented in the early 20th century.

In the 1950s, secretarial dictation and typesetting manuals in America referred to the mark as "bang", perhaps from comic books – where the ! appeared in dialogue bubbles to represent a gun being fired, although the nickname probably emerged from letterpress printing. This "bang" usage is behind the names of the interrobang, an unconventional typographic character, and the shebang, a feature of Unix computer systems.

In the printing world, the exclamation mark can be called a screamer, a gasper, a slammer, a dog's cock, or a startler.

Programmers originally called the exclamation mark by its full name or "shriek", but Unix popularized the "bang" name. For example, the password communicated in the spoken phrase "Your password is em-zero-pee-aitch-bang-en-three" is m0ph!n3.

== Languages ==
The exclamation mark is mainly used in languages that use the Latin alphabet, although usage slightly varies. It has also been adopted in languages written in other scripts, such as languages written with Cyrillic or Arabic scripts, Chinese characters, and Devanagari.

=== English ===
A sentence ending in an exclamation mark may represent an exclamation (such as "Wow!"), interjection ("Boo!"), imperative ("Stop!"), or astonishment or surprise: ("They were the footprints of a gigantic hound!"). Exclamation marks are occasionally placed mid-sentence with a function similar to a comma, for dramatic effect, although this usage is obsolete: "On the walk, oh! there was a frightful noise."

Informally, exclamation marks may be repeated for additional emphasis ("That's great!!!"), but this practice is generally considered unacceptable in formal prose.

The exclamation mark is sometimes used in conjunction with the question mark. This can be in protest or astonishment ("Out of all places, the squatter-camp?!"); a few writers replace this with a single, unconventional punctuation mark, the interrobang, which is the combination of a question mark and an exclamation mark.

Overly frequent use of the exclamation mark is generally considered poor writing, as it distracts the reader and decreases the mark's significance.

Cut out all these exclamation points... An exclamation point is like laughing at your own joke.

— F. Scott Fitzgerald, to Sheilah Graham while editing her radio script.

Some authors, most notably Tom Wolfe, are known for their unashamedly liberal use of the exclamation mark. In comic books, the very frequent use of exclamation marks is common—see Comics, below.

For information on the use of spaces after an exclamation mark, see the discussion of spacing after a period.

Several studies have shown that women use exclamation marks more than men do. One study suggests that, in addition to other uses, exclamation marks may also function as markers of friendly interaction, for example, by making "Hi!" or "Good luck!" seem friendlier than simply "Hi." or "Good luck." (with periods). However, use of exclamation marks in contexts that are not unambiguously positive can be misinterpreted as indicating hostility.

In English writing and often subtitles, a (!) symbol (an exclamation mark within parentheses) implies that a character has made an obviously sarcastic comment e.g.: "Ooh, a sarcasm detector. That's a really useful invention(!)" It is also used to indicate surprise at one's own experience or statement.

=== French ===
In French, as well as marking exclamations or indicating astonishment, the exclamation mark is commonly used to mark orders or requests: Viens ici ! (English: 'Come here!'). When available, a 'narrow no-break space' (espace fine insécable) is used between the last word and the exclamation mark in European French. If not, a regular non-breaking space (espace insécable) is currently used. In Canadian French, either no space is used or a small space (espace fine insécable) is inserted if available. One can also combine an exclamation mark with a question mark at the end of a sentence where appropriate.

=== German ===
German uses the exclamation mark for several things that English conveys with other punctuation:

- It is used at the end of imperative sentences, even when not particularly emphatic: Ruf mich morgen an! (English: 'Call me tomorrow.') A normal period, as in English, is fairly common but is considered substandard.
- A related use is on signs that express a command or interdiction: Betreten verboten! (English: 'No trespassing!').
- The exclamation mark may also be used in the salutation line of a letter: Lieber Hans! (English: 'Dear Hans,'), especially in Austrian German. However, the use of a comma is equally correct and is more common.

=== Cantonese ===
Cantonese has not historically used dedicated punctuation marks, rather relying on grammatical markers to denote the end of a statement. Usage of exclamation marks is common in written Mandarin and in some Yue speaking regions. The Canton and Hong Kong regions, however, generally refused to accept the exclamation mark as it was seen as carrying with it unnecessary and confusing Western connotations. However, an exclamation mark, including in some written representations of colloquy in Cantonese, can be used informally to indicate strong feelings.

=== Greek ===
In Modern Greek, the exclamation mark (Θαυμαστικό, thavmastikó) has been introduced from Latin scripts and is used identically, although without the reluctance seen in English usage. A minor grammatical difference is that, while a series of interjections each employ an exclamation mark (e.g., Ωχ! Αχ!, [Ōch! Ach!, 'Oops! Oh!']), an interjection should only be separated from an extended exclamation by a comma (e.g., Ωχ, ξέχασα το μάτι της κουζίνας ανοιχτό!, Ōch, xéchasa to máti tīs kouzínas anoichtó!, 'Oops! I left the stove on.').

=== Hungarian ===
In Hungarian, an exclamation mark is put at the end of exclamatory, imperative or prohibitive sentences, and sentences expressing a wish (e.g. De szép! – 'How beautiful!', A fűre lépni tilos! – 'Keep off the grass', Bárcsak sikerülne a tervem! – 'If only my plan would work out.'). The use of the exclamation mark is also needed when addressing someone and the addressing is a separate sentence. (typically at the beginning of letters, e.g. Kedves Péter! – 'Dear Peter,'). Greetings are also typically terminated with an exclamation mark (e.g. Jó estét! – 'Good evening.').

=== Solomon Islands Pidgin ===
In Solomon Islands Pidgin, the phrase may be between admiration marks. Compare Nomoa. ("No.") and !Nomoa nao! ("Certainly not!").

=== Spanish ===
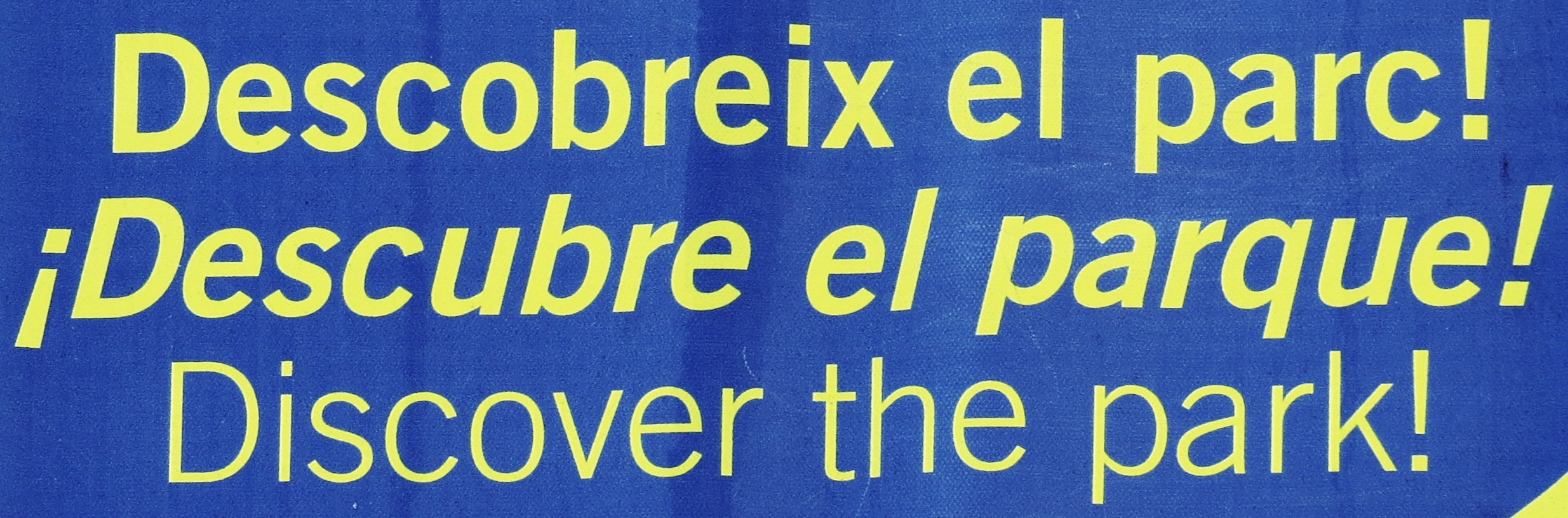
Trilingual billboard in Barcelona (detail), showing the initial exclamation mark for Spanish, but not for Catalan (top line) and English

In Spanish, a sentence or clause ending in an exclamation mark must also begin with an inverted exclamation mark (the same also applies to the question mark): ¿Estás loco? ¡Casi la matas!, 'Are you crazy? You almost killed her!'

As in British English, a bracketed exclamation mark may be used to indicate irony or surprise at a statement: Dice que esta noche no va a salir de fiesta (!), 'He said that he's not going to a party tonight(!).' Such use is not matched by an inverted opening exclamation mark.

=== Turkish ===
In Turkish, an exclamation mark is used after a sentence or phrase for emphasis, and is common following both commands and the addressees of such commands. For example, in the Ordular! İlk hedefiniz Akdenizdir, ileri! ('Armies! Your first target is the Mediterranean') order by Atatürk, ordular ('the armies') constitute the addressee. It is further used in parentheses, (!), after a sentence or phrase to indicate irony or sarcasm: Çok iyi bir iş yaptın (!), 'You've done a very good job – Not!'.

=== Limbu ===
In Limbu, an exclamation mark (᥄) is used after a Limbu sentence or phrase for emphasis, and is common following both commands and the addressees of such commands. For example, in the Limbu sentence ᤐᤚᤢ᥄ ᤄᤨᤘᤑ ᤂᤥᤆᤌᤙ Mediterranean, ᤚᤦᤛᤅ᥄ (Paṡu! Ghōwapha khōcathaśa Mediterranean, ṡausaṅa!, 'Armies! Your first target is the Mediterranean!').

It is further used in parentheses, (᥄), after a sentence or phrase to indicate irony or sarcasm: ᤖᤥᤂᤌ ᤔᤚᤗ ᤐᤤ ᤊᤇ ᤃᤦᤄ (᥄) (Rōkhatha maṡala pai yancha gaugha (!), 'You did a very good job — Not!').

=== Phonetics ===
In Khoisan languages, and the International Phonetic Alphabet, a symbol that looks like the exclamation mark is used as a letter to indicate the postalveolar click sound (represented as q in Zulu orthography). It is a vertical bar with underdot. In Unicode, this letter is properly coded as U+01C3 ǃ LATIN LETTER RETROFLEX CLICK and distinguished from the common punctuation symbol U+0021 ! EXCLAMATION MARK to allow software to deal properly with word breaks.

The exclamation mark has sometimes been used as a phonetic symbol to indicate that a consonant is ejective. More commonly, this is represented by an apostrophe, or a superscript glottal stop symbol (U+02C0 ˀ MODIFIER LETTER GLOTTAL STOP).

== Proper names ==
Although not part of dictionary words, exclamation marks appear in some brand names and trade names, including Yum! Brands (parent of fast food chains like Taco Bell and KFC), Web services Yahoo! and Joomla!, and the online game Kahoot!, although some media style guides, including those of Reuters and The Economist, omit such marks from trade names. It appears in the titles of some stage and screen works, especially comedies and musicals; examples include the game show Jeopardy!; the 1960s musical TV show Shindig!; musicals Oklahoma!, Mamma Mia!, Oliver!, and Oh! Calcutta!; and movies Airplane! and Moulin Rouge!. In the 1970s, the exclamation mark fell out of favor for major musicals, but has remained common in ironic or parody titles. In the 2016 United States presidential campaign, Republican candidate Jeb Bush used "Jeb!" as his campaign logo.

=== Place names ===
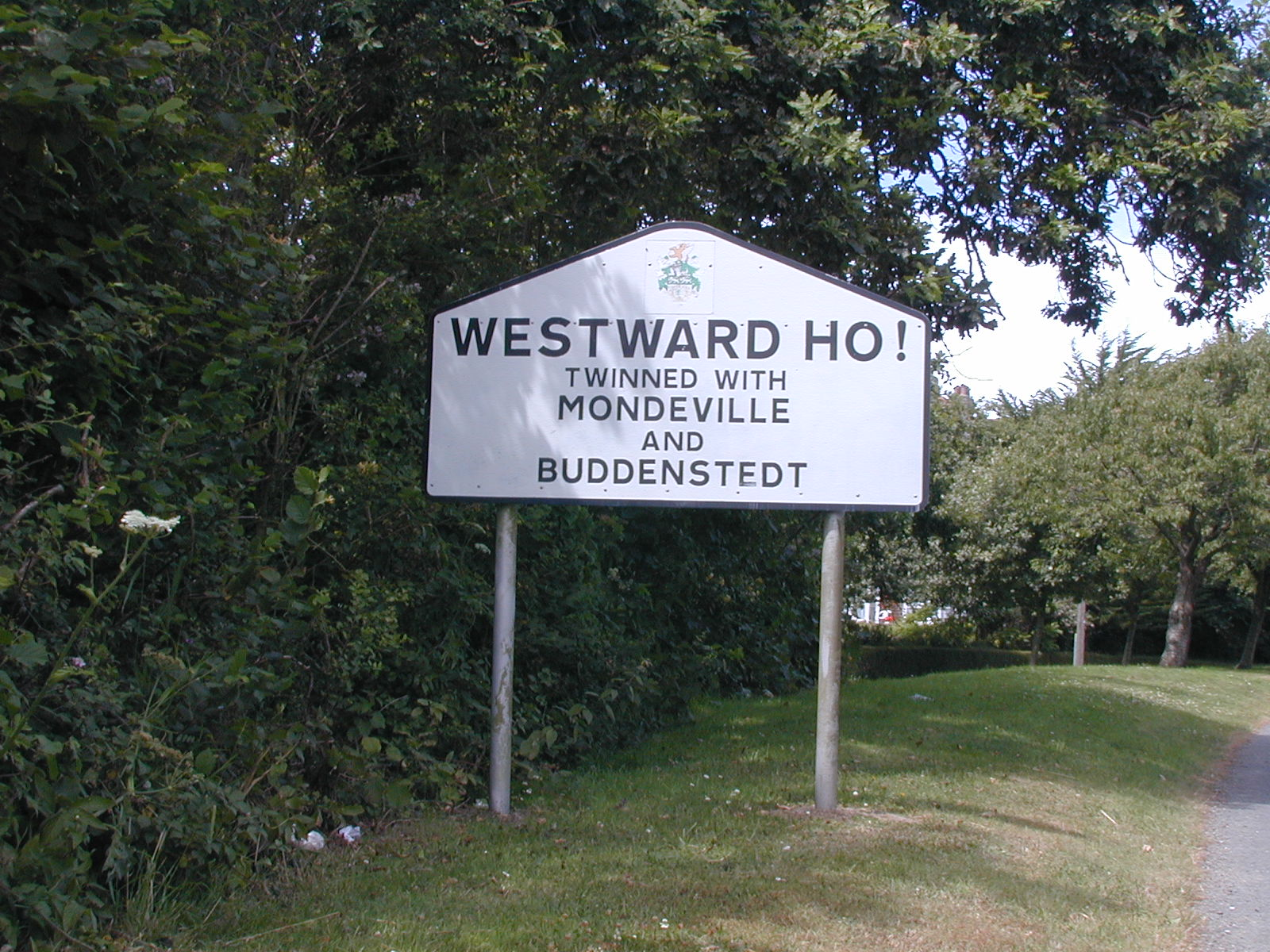
Road sign marking the entrance to Westward Ho!

The English town of Westward Ho!, named after the novel by Charles Kingsley, is the only place name in the United Kingdom that officially contains an exclamation mark. There is a town in Quebec called Saint-Louis-du-Ha! Ha!, which is spelled with two exclamation marks. The city of Hamilton, Ohio, changed its name to Hamilton! in 1986, but neither the United States Board on Geographic Names nor mapmakers Rand McNally recognized the change. The city of Ostrava, Czech Republic, changed its logotype to Ostrava!!! in 2008.

== Warnings ==
A hazard warning sign with an exclamation mark.

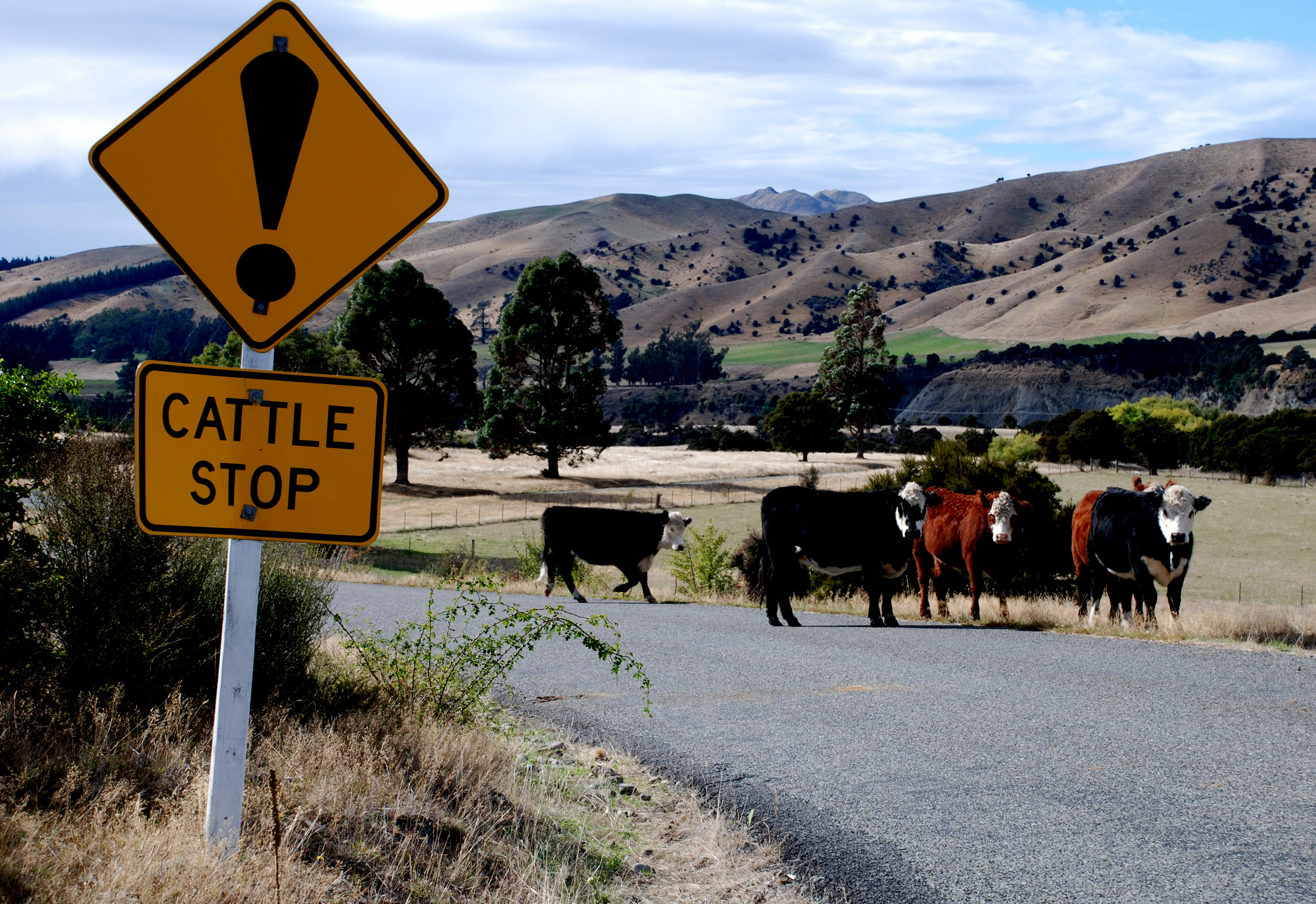
New Zealand road sign warning of a "cattle stop" (cattle grid/cattle guard)

Exclamation marks are used to emphasize a precautionary statement. On warning signs, an exclamation mark is often used to draw attention to a warning of danger, hazards, and the unexpected. These signs are common in hazardous environments or on potentially dangerous equipment. A common type of this warning is a yellow triangle with a black exclamation mark, but a white triangle, with a red border is common on European road warning signs. In most cases, a pictogram indicating the nature of the hazard is enclosed in the triangle but an exclamation mark may be used instead as a generic symbol; a plate beneath identifies the hazard.

== Use in various fields ==
Zirkel of Corps Hubertia Freiburg

The Zirkel monogram of a German Studentenverbindung includes an exclamation mark if the society is still active.

=== Mathematics and formal logic ===
In mathematics the symbol represents the factorial operation. The expression n! means "the product of the integers from 1 to n", for example, 4! (read four factorial) is 4 × 3 × 2 × 1 = 24. Two exclamation marks (n!!) is the double factorial, which is a smaller value. In front of a number (!n) represents the subfactorial.

It is used to represent the uniqueness quantifier.

In linear logic, the exclamation mark denotes one of the modalities that control weakening and contraction.

=== Computing ===
In computing, the exclamation mark is ASCII character 33 (21 in hexadecimal). Due to its availability even on early computers, the character was used for many purposes. The name given to "!" by programmers varies according to their background, though it was very common to give it a short name to make reading code aloud easier. "Bang" is very popular. In the UK, the term pling was popular in the earlier days of computing, whilst in the United States, the term shriek was used. It is claimed that these word usages were invented in the US and shriek is from Stanford or MIT; however, shriek for the ! sign is found in the Oxford English Dictionary dating from the 1860s.

Many computer languages using C-style syntax use "!" for logical negation; !A means "not A", and A != B means "A is not equal to B". This negation principle has spread to ordinary language; for example, the word "!clue" is used as a synonym for "no-clue" or "clueless". The symbol in formal logic for negation is ¬ but, as this symbol is not present as standard on most keyboards, the C convention has spread informally to other contexts.

In Cascading Style Sheets (CSS), "!" is used as a delimiter in the !important flag, which alters the rules selecting declarations. The flag means "important", rather than "not important", which usage of "!" might suggest.

In Hypertext Markup Language (HTML), "!" appears as part of the Document type declaration as, for example, <!DOCTYPE html>. It also forms part of the HTML opening comment delimiter <!−−.

Early email systems also used the exclamation mark as a separator character between hostnames for routing information, usually referred to as "bang path" notation.

In the IRC protocol, a user's nickname and ident are separated by an exclamation mark in the hostmask assigned to them by the server.

In UNIX scripting (typically for UNIX shell or Perl), "!" is usually used after a "#" in the first line of a script, the interpreter directive, to tell the OS what program to use to run the script. #! is usually called a "hash-bang" or shebang. A similar convention for PostScript files calls for the first line to begin with %!, called "percent-bang".

An exclamation mark starts history expansions in many Unix shells such as bash and tcsh where !! executes the previous command and !* refers to all the arguments from the previous command.

Acorn RISC OS uses filenames starting with pling to create an application directory: for instance, a file called !Run is executed when the folder containing it is double-clicked (holding down shift prevents this). There is also !Boot (executed the first time the application containing it comes into view of the filer), !Sprites (icons), !Help, and others.

In APL, !x is used for the factorial of x (backwards from math notation), and also for the binomial coefficient: k!n means $\tbinom nk$ or n!/k!(n–k)!.

BBC BASIC used the exclamation mark as an indirection operator, equivalent to PEEK and POKE of four bytes at once.

BCPL, the precursor of C, used "!" for pointer and array indirection: !P is equivalent to *P in C, and P!3 is equivalent to P[3] in C.

In the Xbase family of programming languages, which includes dBase and FoxPro, an exclamation mark, when used as part of an expression, indicates negation. For example, != means "not equal to". At the start of a line of code, it is a synonym for RUN (which executes an external program).

In the Haskell programming language, "!" is used to express strictness.

In the Kotlin programming language, "!!" ("double-bang") is the not-null assertion operator, used to override null safety so as to allow a null pointer exception.

In the ML programming language (including Standard ML and OCaml), "!" is the operator to get the value out of a "reference" data structure.

In the Raku programming language, the "!" twigil is used to access private attributes or methods in a class (like class Person { has $!name; } or self!private-method;).

In the Scheme, Julia, and Ruby programming languages, "!" is conventionally the suffix for functions and special forms that mutate their input.

In the Swift programming language, a type followed by "!" denotes an "implicitly unwrapped optional", an option type where the compiler does not enforce safe unwrapping. The "!" operator "force unwraps" an option type, causing an error if it is nil.

In Geek Code version 3, "!" is used before a letter to denote that the geek refuses to participate in the topic at hand. In some cases, it has an alternate meaning, such as G! denoting a geek of no qualifications, !d denoting not wearing any clothes, P! denoting not being allowed to use Perl, and so on. They all share some negative connotations, however.

! is used to denote changed lines in diff output in the context format. In the unified format, changes to a single line are denoted as an addition and deletion.

=== Video games ===
The exclamation mark can be used in video games to signify that a character is startled or alarmed. In the Metal Gear and Paper Mario series, an exclamation mark appears over enemies' heads when they notice the player.

In massively multiplayer online games such as World of Warcraft, an exclamation mark hovering over a character's head is often used to indicate that they are offering a quest for the player to complete.

In Dota 2, an exclamation mark is shown above the head of a unit if it is killed by means not granting enemies experience or gold (if it is "denied").

In the 2005 arcade dance simulation game In the Groove 2, there is a song titled "!" (also referred to as "bang") by the artist Onyx.

=== Internet culture ===
In Internet culture, especially where leet is used, multiple exclamation marks may be affixed with the numeral "1", as in !!!!!!111. The notation originates from a common error: when typing multiple exclamation points quickly, the typist may fail to hold the ⇧ Shift+1 combination that produces the exclamation mark on many keyboard layouts. This error, first used intentionally as a joke in the leet linguistic community, is now an accepted form of exclamation in leet and derivative dialects such as Lolspeak. Some utterances include further substitutions, for example "!!!111oneeleven".

In fandom and fanfiction, an exclamation mark is used to signify a defining quality in a character, usually signifying an alternative interpretation of a character from a canonical work. Examples of this would be "Romantic!Draco" or "Vampire!Harry" from the Harry Potter fandom. It is also used to clarify the current persona of a character with multiple identities or appearances, such as to distinguish "Armor!Al" from "Human!Al" in a work based on Fullmetal Alchemist. The origin of this usage is unknown, although it is hypothesized to have originated with certain Teenage Mutant Ninja Turtles action figures; for example, "Football Player! Leonardo", "Rockstar! Raphael", and "Breakdancer! Michelangelo".

=== Comics ===
This Action Comics cover from 1959 ends every sentence with an exclamation point or question mark. Often, few or no periods would be used in the entire book.

Some comic books, especially superhero comics of the mid-20th century, routinely use the exclamation point instead of the period, which means the character has just realized something; unlike when the question mark appears instead, which means the character is confused, surprised or they do not know what is happening. This tends to lead to exaggerated speech, in line with the other hyperboles common in comic books. A portion of the motivation, however, was simply that a period might disappear in the printing process used at the time, whereas an exclamation point would likely remain recognizable even if there was a printing glitch. For a short period, Stan Lee, as editor-in-chief of Marvel Comics, attempted to curb their overuse by a short-lived ban on exclamation marks altogether, which led to an inadvertent lack of ending punctuation in many sentences.

Comic book writer Elliot S! Maggin once accidentally signed his name with an exclamation due to the habit of using them when writing comic scripts; it became his professional name from then on. Similarly, comic artist Scott Shaw has used the exclamation point after his name throughout his career.

In comic books and comics in general, a large exclamation point is often used near or over a character's head to indicate surprise. A question mark can similarly be used to indicate confusion.

=== Chess ===
In chess annotation, "!" denotes a good move, "!!" denotes an excellent move, "?!" denotes a dubious move, and "!?" denotes an interesting, risky move. ('Annotation' here refers to post-match commentary use). Standard chess notation used to record game moves does not use the exclamation mark. In some chess variants, such as large-board Shogi variants, "!" is used to record pieces captured by stationary feeding or burning.)

=== Scrabble ===
In Scrabble, an exclamation mark written after a word is used to indicate its presence in the Official Tournament and Club Word List but its absence from the Official Scrabble Players Dictionary, usually because the word has been judged offensive.

=== Baseball ===
Exclamation points or asterisks can be used on scorecards to denote a "great defensive play".

=== Popular music ===
The band !!! (pronounced "Chk Chk Chk") uses exclamation points as its name.

In 2008, the pop-punk band Panic! at the Disco dropped the exclamation point in its name; this became the "most-discussed topic on [fan] message boards around the world". In 2009, the exclamation mark was re-inserted following the band's split.

The band Bomb the Music Industry! utilizes an exclamation mark in its name, as well as several album and song titles and promotional material. Examples include their songs "(Shut) Up The Punx!!!" and the album Adults!!!: Smart!!! Shithammered!!! And Excited by Nothing!!!!!!!.

American musician Pink stylizes her stage name "P!NK", and uses three exclamation points in the subtitle of her 2010 release, Greatest Hits... So Far!!!.

=== Television ===
The exclamation mark was included in the title of Dinah Shore's TV series, Dinah! The exclamation mark was later the subject of a bitter argument between Elaine Benes and her boyfriend, Jake Jarmel, in the Seinfeld episode, "The Sniffing Accountant". Elaine got upset with Jake for not putting an exclamation mark at the end of a message about her friend having a baby. Jake took extreme exception to the trivial criticism and broke up with Elaine, putting an exclamation mark after his parting words: "I'm leaving!"

== Unicode code-points (with HTML) ==
- U+0021 ! EXCLAMATION MARK (HTML &#33;, &excl; (Note: HTML5 is the only version of HTML that has a named entity for the exclamation mark.))

Related forms have these code points:

- U+00A1 ¡ INVERTED EXCLAMATION MARK (&iexcl;)
- U+01C3 ǃ LATIN LETTER RETROFLEX CLICK (In IPA: alveolar click)
- U+203C ‼ DOUBLE EXCLAMATION MARK (for use in vertical text)
  - ‼️ with emoji variation selector
- U+203D ‽ INTERROBANG
- U+2E18 ⸘ INVERTED INTERROBANG
- U+2048 ⁈ QUESTION EXCLAMATION MARK (for use in vertical text)
- U+2049 ⁉ EXCLAMATION QUESTION MARK (for use in vertical text)
  - ⁉️ with emoji variation selector
- U+26A0 ⚠ WARNING SIGN (exclamation mark in triangle)
- U+2755 ❕ WHITE EXCLAMATION MARK ORNAMENT (in Unicode lingo, "white" means hollow)
- U+2757 ❗ HEAVY EXCLAMATION MARK SYMBOL
- U+2762 ❢ HEAVY EXCLAMATION MARK ORNAMENT
- U+2763 ❣ HEAVY HEART EXCLAMATION MARK ORNAMENT
  - ❣️ with emoji variation selector
- U+2E53 ⹓ MEDIEVAL EXCLAMATION MARK
- U+A71D ꜝ MODIFIER LETTER RAISED EXCLAMATION MARK
- U+A71E ꜞ MODIFIER LETTER RAISED INVERTED EXCLAMATION MARK
- U+A71F ꜟ MODIFIER LETTER LOW INVERTED EXCLAMATION MARK
- U+FE15 ︕ PRESENTATION FORM FOR VERTICAL EXCLAMATION MARK
- U+FE57 ﹗ SMALL EXCLAMATION MARK (for special applications within CJK text)
- U+FF01 ！ FULLWIDTH EXCLAMATION MARK (for special applications within CJK text)
- U+E0021 TAG EXCLAMATION MARK

The English Phonotypic Alphabet has two unique question marks:

- U+2E60 ⹠ WIGGLY EXCLAMATION MARK
- U+2E61 ⹡ INVERTED WIGGLY EXCLAMATION MARK

Some emojis include an exclamation mark:

- U+1F199 🆙 SQUARED UP WITH EXCLAMATION MARK
- U+1F51B 🔛 ON WITH EXCLAMATION MARK WITH LEFT RIGHT ARROW ABOVE

Some scripts have their own exclamation mark:

- U+055C ՜ ARMENIAN EXCLAMATION MARK
- U+07F9 ߹ NKO EXCLAMATION MARK
- U+109F ႟ MYANMAR SYMBOL SHAN EXCLAMATION
- U+1944 ᥄ LIMBU EXCLAMATION MARK
- U+AA77 ꩷ MYANMAR SYMBOL AITON EXCLAMATION
- U+1E95E 𞥞 ADLAM INITIAL EXCLAMATION MARK

== See also ==
- Terminal punctuation – Marks that identify the end of some text
