= Quinnipiac Barnacle =

Parody newspaper at Quinnipiac University

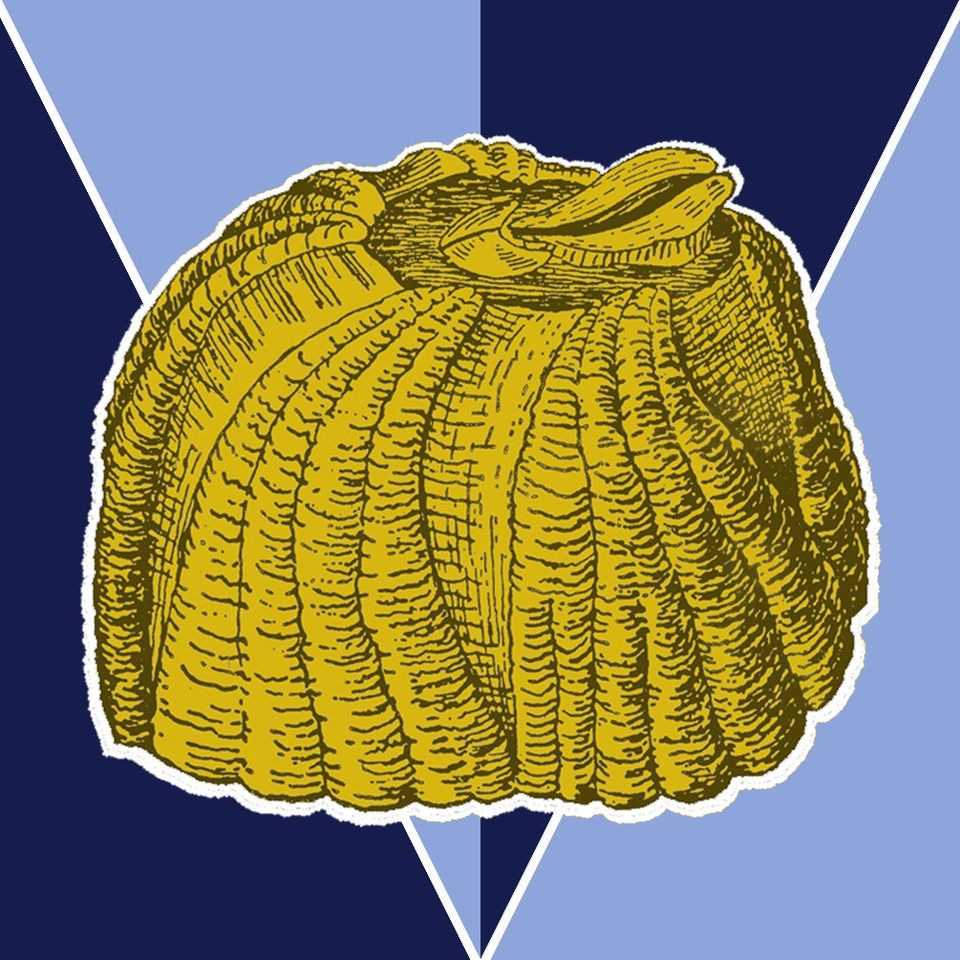
- Type: Satirical news organization
- Format: Tabloid and Website
- Founder(s): Shane Collins and William Vessio
- Editor-in-chief: Adam Silver
- Founded: November 5, 2012; 12 years ago
- Website: quinnipiacbarnacle.wixsite.com/qubarnacle

The Quinnipiac Barnacle is a university club and parody newspaper at Quinnipiac University in Hamden, Connecticut. The Barnacle publishes satire Quinnipiac, political, and pop culture related articles both digitally and in print editions each school semester.

== History ==
While the official website of The Quinnipiac Barnacle states humorously that it was started in 1964 by former Quinnipiac University President John Lahey, it was actually started on November 5, 2012, by juniors Shane Collins and William Vessio as a parody news website. The website received popularity and press on-campus, as well as strong negative feedback. In Fall 2013, The Barnacle became an officially recognized organization on the Quinnipiac campus and came out with its first print edition on September 4, 2013.

The Barnacle used to have a web video series called BarnacleTV, and occasionally runs a news program called The Barncast that airs during the school year.

== Controversy ==
An unofficial newspaper on the Quinnipiac campus, The Quad News, published a negative article about The Barnacle on November 11, 2012. Shortly after, The Barnacle published a satirical response to the article titled "Quad News Staff Tries to Draw a Line."

== See also ==
- List of satirical news websites
- College humor magazines
