= William A. Dyer =

- Born: October 23, 1902; Providence, Rhode Island, US
- Died: March 26, 1993 (aged 90); Indianapolis, Indiana, US
- Education: Brown University
- Occupation(s): journalist, editor
- Years active: 1944–1990

William Allan Dyer Jr. (1902-1993) was general manager and president of the Indianapolis Star and Indianapolis News Inc.

== Career ==
Bill Dyer entered the newspaper business as editor of the Brown University's The Brown Daily Herald and The Brown Jug. After graduation, Dyer spent a year as a reporter for the Syracuse Journal, followed by 16 years with the Syracuse Post-Standard as advertising salesman, then manager, and finally director. After four years as lieutenant commander in the U.S. Navy (1941–44), he became general manager of the Indianapolis Star and Indianapolis News in 1949. Dyer became vice president of the Indianapolis newspapers in 1958 and president of the Indianapolis and Muncie newspapers in 1975.

== Personal life ==
Dyer served Brown as a trustee, secretary and president of the Brown Club of Indiana, and as chief marshal of his 50th reunion. He received an honorary LL.D. from Brown in 1984. Dyer was married to Marian Blumer Dyer, with whom he had two sons. In 1995, an endowed professorship, the "William A. Dyer Jr. Assistant Professorship" was announced in his honor.
