= Michael J. Silverstein =

American business consultant and author (born 1955)

- Born: New York City
- Education: Brown University, Harvard Business School
- Occupations: Business consultant, Author
- Employer: The Boston Consulting Group
- Website: Boston Consulting Group

Michael J. Silverstein (born 1955) is an American business consultant and author. He is an independent private equity investor and chairman of several startup enterprises, including Coterie Diaper and Hand IQ.

== Career ==
Silverstein was a senior partner and managing director at The Boston Consulting Group. He was one of the founders of the firm's global consumer practice and is known for his expertise in consumer behavior, retail, and marketing, particularly as it relates to the female economy. He is the author of Trading Up: The New American Luxury, Treasure Hunt: Inside the Mind of the New Consumer, Women Want More: How to Capture Your Share of the World's Largest Fastest-Growing Market, and The Ten Trillion Dollar Prize: Captivating the Newly Affluent in China and India. He is a regular contributor to Bloomberg Television.

== See also ==
- The Boston Consulting Group

== Bibliography ==
- Silverstein, Michael J.; Bolden, Dylan; Jacobsen, Rune; Sajdeh, Rohan (2015). "Rocket: Eight Lessons to Secure Infinite Growth" McGraw Hill Education. ISBN 978-1-259-58542-5
- Silverstein, Michael J.; Abheek Singhi, Carol Liao, David Michael; with Simon Targett (2012). The $10 Trillion Prize: Captivating the Newly Affluent in China and India. Harvard Business Review Press. ISBN 1422187055.
- Silverstein, Michael J.; Kate Sayre, John Butman (2009). Women Want More: How to Capture Your Share of the World's Largest, Fastest-Growing Market. HarperBusiness. ISBN 0061776416.
- Silverstein, Michael J.; John Butman (2006). Treasure Hunt: Inside the Mind of the New Consumer. Portfolio. ISBN 1591841232.
- Silverstein, Michael J.; John Butman (2003). Trading Up: Why Consumers Want New Luxury Goods--and How Companies Create Them. Portfolio Trade. ISBN 1591840708.
