= Thatch (comic strip) =

Syndicated 1990s comic strip by Jeff Shesol

Thatch was a comic strip created by Jeff Shesol. The strip began in Brown University's student newspaper The Brown Daily Herald. It was later picked up for syndication by Creators Syndicate in late 1994.

The title character was an everyman who struggled through life and politics. He had an alter-ego, Politically Correct Person (P.C. Person), who was a stereotype of sensitive liberals who fear offending people. Other characters were Tripp, Thatch's womanizing, obnoxious roommate; Kate, editor of the college paper; and Sloane, a "heartless, shallow rich bitch," as described by the cartoonist in the strip's first and only book collection.

In 1998, Shesol was offered a position as speech writer for the President of the United States Bill Clinton. Shesol agreed and ended the strip. The final Thatch appeared on April 11, 1998.
