= Whitney Darrow Jr. =

American cartoonist

Whitney Darrow Jr. (August 22, 1909 – August 10, 1999) was a prominent American cartoonist, who worked most of his career for The New Yorker, with some 1,500 of his cartoons printed in his nearly 50-year-long career with the magazine.

== Biography ==
Darrow was born in Princeton, New Jersey, where his father Whitney Darrow was founding director of Princeton University Press. Darrow grew up in Greenwich, Connecticut, where he attended Greenwich High School. He graduated in 1931 from Princeton University, where he wrote humor for the Daily Princetonian and was art director for the Princeton Tiger Magazine. He honed his craft at Art Students League of New York with instructors including painter Thomas Hart Benton. In his early 20s began selling cartoons to Judge, Life and College Humor. As a 24-year-old in 1933, he sold his first cartoon to The New Yorker, while the magazine, which had been founded in 1925, was still in its infancy. This first cartoon depicted three nudists, two women observing a man, with one woman telling the other, "Last night I saw him in a blue serge suit. Zowie!"

The humor in Darrow's cartoons often focused on the absurdities and behavioral contradictions of middle-class suburban life, and featured characters such as judges, children, windbags, and individuals in varying states of drunkenness. A classic Darrow depicts a group of small schoolchildren observing Édouard Manet's Le déjeuner sur l'herbe (The Luncheon on the Grass), depicting a female nude with two fully dressed men, being told in explanation by their adult guide that "Well, it was sort of like a cook-out." He published four collections of his cartoons, You're Sitting on My Eyelashes, Give Up?, Stop, Miss and Please Pass the Hostess. He illustrated children's books and other books written by such authors as Nathaniel Benchley, Jean Kerr, and Johnny Carson.

A master draftsman who (unlike most of his colleagues) wrote his own captions, Darrow was among the last of the New Yorker's early cartoonists, joining Charles Addams, Peter Arno, George Price and James Thurber. Darrow retired from the magazine in 1982.

Darrow died in Burlington, Vermont. He and his wife Mildred lived in Shelburne, Vermont.
