= Michael Witte =

American cartoonist

Michael Witte (born 1944) is an American-born illustrator and cartoonist.

Witte has been a regular contributor to TIME, Harper’s, Rolling Stone, Fortune, The New York Times and The Wall Street Journal. His art has appeared on the covers of The New Yorker, Atlantic Monthly, Newsweek, Forbes and the Princeton Alumni Weekly as well as "The New Yorker Book of" cartoon series. He wrote and illustrated the best-selling Book of Terns (1978), Claus! (1982) and also co-wrote Otter Nonsense (1994) with best-selling children's book author Norton Juster.

From 1974 to 1976, Witte collaborated with Mets/Phillies pitching great Tug McGraw on a nationally syndicated, sports-themed comic strip Scroogie. The strips were collected in Scroogie (1976) and Hello There, Ball! (1977). A lifelong baseball fan, Witte later contributed on-the-air cartoon commentary during the 2003 Yankees-Marlins World Series. Since 2005, he has worked as a pitching and hitting mechanics consultant to the St. Louis Cardinals.

== Awards ==
He is a recipient of the Page One Award from The Newspaper Guild and consecutive National Headliner awards as America's best illustrator (1993 & 1994). He has received numerous Art Direction Awards from The Society of Illustrators.

== Personal ==
Michael Witte was born in rural St. Louis and spent his childhood working in his parents' country store. While a scholarship student at Princeton University, he served as art editor to the campus humor periodical, Tiger Magazine. He now resides in South Nyack, New York with his wife, Sally. Together they have three sons, Griff, Spencer and Drew.
