= Simon Targett =

English historian and journalist (born 1964)

Simon Targett (born 1964) is an English historian, lecturer and freelance journalist. He is a former associate editor of the Financial Times. In March 2018 Barnes & Noble included his book New World, Inc.: The Making of America by England’s Merchant Adventurers, co-written with American business writer John Butman, in its list of best history books of the month.

Targett has a PhD in History from the University of Cambridge.

In 2024 he was elected chair of the Richmond Local History Society in Richmond, London. He has given talks to the society on George Vancouver, on Robert Walpole and on Richmond and Mortlake’s part in the founding of America and the launching of the British Empire.

== Works ==
=== Books ===
- (with John Butman) New World, Inc: The Making of America by England's Merchant Adventurers, 432 pp. (Little, Brown and Company, 2018) ISBN 978-0316307888
- (with Michael J. Silverstein, Abheek Singhi, Carol Liao and David Michael). The 10 Trillion Dollar Prize: Captivating the Newly Affluent in China and India (Harvard Business Review Press, 2012) ISBN 978-1422187050

=== Journal articles ===
- "A house, a tomb, a monkey puzzle tree, a fight and a book of discovery: George Vancouver's connection with Petersham, Kew and Richmond". Richmond History: Journal of the Richmond Local History Society. 44: 46–56. 2024. ISSN 0263-0958.
- "Sir Robert Walpole, Britain's first Prime Minister, and his connections with Richmond". Richmond History: Journal of the Richmond Local History Society. 43: 7–17. 2023. ISSN 0263-0958.
- "A momentous conversation in Richmond Palace: the three secrets that Francis Drake told Queen Elizabeth on his return from circumnavigating the world". Richmond History: Journal of the Richmond Local History Society. 41: 86–92. 2020. ISSN 0263-0958.
- Targett, Simon (1994). "Government and Ideology during the Age of Whig Supremacy: The Political Argument of Sir Robert Walpole's Newspaper Propagandists". The Historical Journal. 37 (2). Cambridge University Press: 289–317. doi:10.1017/S0018246X00016484. ISSN 0018-246X.

== Personal life ==
Targett lives in St Margarets, London.
