= There once was a man from Nantucket =

Opening line to many comic limericks

"There once was a man from Nantucket" is the opening line for many limericks, in which the name of the island of Nantucket creates often ribald rhymes and puns. The protagonist in the obscene versions is typically portrayed as well-endowed and hypersexualized. The opening line is so well known that it has been used as a stand-alone joke, implying upcoming obscenities.

== History ==
The earliest published version appeared in 1879 in The Pearl, Volume 3 (September 1879):

There was a young man of Nantucket.
Who went down a well in a bucket;
The last words he spoke.
Before the rope broke,
Were, "Arsehole, you bugger, and suck it."

Another early published version appeared in 1902 in the Princeton Tiger written by Prof. Dayton Voorhees:

There once was a man from Nantucket
Who kept all his cash in a bucket.
But his daughter, named Nan,
Ran away with a man
And as for the bucket, Nantucket.

Other publications seized upon the "Nantucket" motif, spawning many sequels.

Among the best-known are:

Pa followed the pair to Pawtucket
(The man and the girl with the bucket)
And he said to the man,
"You're welcome to Nan,"
But as for the bucket, Pawtucket.

Followed later by:

Then the pair followed Pa to Manhasset,
Where he still held the cash as an asset;
And Nan and the man
Stole the money and ran,
And as for the bucket, Manhasset.

== Ribald versions ==
The many ribald versions of the limerick are the basis for its lasting popularity. Many variations on the theme are possible because of the ease of rhyming "Nantucket" with certain vulgar phrases. The following example comes from Immortalia: An Anthology of American Ballads, Sailors' Songs, Cowboy Songs, College Songs, Parodies, Limericks, and Other Humorous Verses and Doggerel, published in 1927:

There was a young man from Nantucket,
Whose cock was so long he could suck it;
He said with a grin,
As he wiped off his chin,
"If my ear was a cunt I could fuck it."
