= Sundial Humor Magazine =

Humor magazine

- Founded: 1911
- Based in: The Ohio State University Columbus, Ohio US
- Website: https://org.osu.edu/sundial/

The Sundial Humor Magazine is an independent humor magazine in Columbus, Ohio, by students at Ohio State University. Founded in 1911, it is one of the oldest college humor magazines in the country.

The magazine has an infrequent history, having several hiatuses, most recently revived in 2011 when it switched to an online format. Print copies returned that year in the structure of several zines throughout the school year, with satirical articles, videos, and comics published frequently on the web.

The Sundial is most famous for its former editors, James Thurber, who served in the role for one year, and R.L. Stine, who served in that role for three years. The magazine's staff and alumni have formed other student organizations at Ohio State, including 8th Floor Improv Club, Fishbowl Improv Club, Backburner Sketch Comedy, and Buckeye Standup Club.

== History ==
=== Origin of the name ===
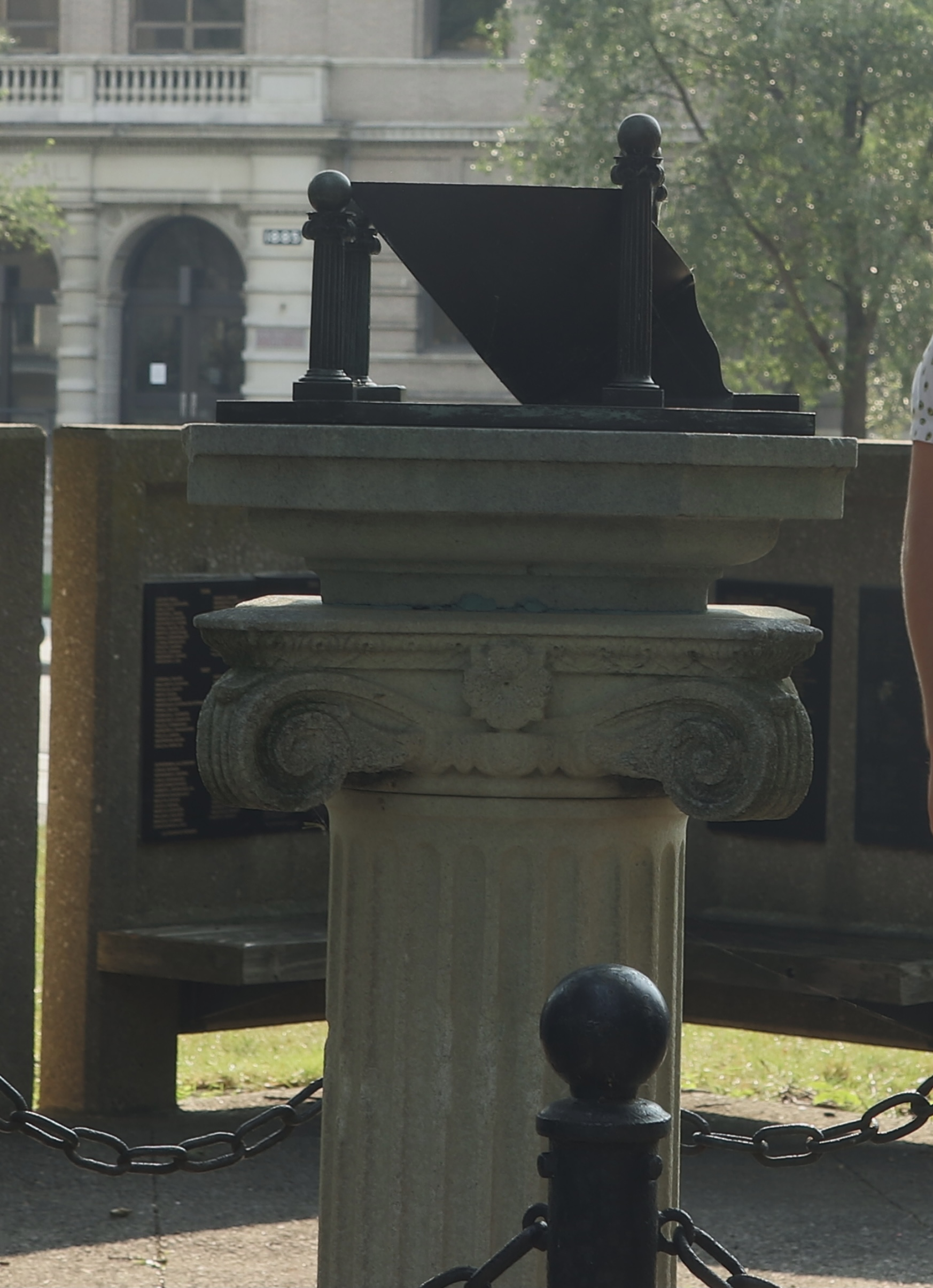
Namesake Sundial, located on the north end of Thompson Library at Ohio State

The Sundial's notable name is derived from the Sundial located on the north side of Thompson Library. Donated by the class of 1905, it was designed by Albert Crehole, and is one of three remaining sundials designed by him left in the world.

=== Early history (1911 to 1961) ===
The Sundial was founded in 1911 by several students in the style of other previously founded college humor magazines, such as Harvard's Lampoon or the Yale Record. Gardner Rea, one of the first contributing cartoonists to The New Yorker, was a founding member. From 1916 to 1918, then-student James Thurber served as the editor of the magazine.

After Thurber's graduation, the Sundial continued to publish, making fun of university officials. The magazine was briefly banned in 1944 by university President Howard Bevis after publishing an obscene cover of its Freshman Uplift edition, where a student is leering at a buxom coed.

In 1946, after the magazine was accused of obscenity, the university replaced it with a new one called Scarlet Fever. Thurber, who by then was a famous author, wrote a letter to the president objecting to the name change, promising to remain "...actively indignant on this subject until the cheap title Scarlet Fever is abandoned." The university later restored the name The Sundial.

=== R.L. Stine, and the peak of popularity (1961 to 1965) ===
In the fall of 1961, R.L Stine joined the staff of The Sundial, and took over as editor the following spring. Stine, known to the student body as "Jovial Bob Stine", revamped the magazine best described as "sarcasm, satire, and sex." During this period, the magazine often poked fun of those in power, the student newspaper The Lantern, the Columbus newspaper The Dispatch, the Women's Self Government Association, the Greek System, the university's agricultural heritage, and the administration.

In 1965, Stine took the magazine to new heights. He first announced his candidacy as student body president in February as Jovial Bob Stine, despite being ineligible to run for the position as he was about to graduate. His reasoning for running was simply stated as "Students had come to expect nothing of student government, and he was in the best position to deliver it." In April, the magazine began selling sweatshirts with the phrase "The Big Farm: Ohia State". This proved to be a successful endeavor, as The Sundial garnered eight thousand new subscriptions, and in May 1965, was voted a top five college humor magazine by editors across the nation.

=== Later history (1965 to present) ===
Falling on financial struggles, the magazine ceased production in 1968, and since has had an on and off again history. In 2011, backed by financial assistance from R.L Stine, student Nathan Varrone restarted the publishing of The Sundial. The modern edition is published online and in-print (in the form of several themed zines throughout the semester), as well as featuring comics, videos, and articles frequently on their website.

== Backburner Sketch Comedy ==
In 2016, many of the Sundial Humor Magazine's staff writers created Backburner Sketch Comedy, a separate student organization at Ohio State University with the shared purpose of writing original, student sketch comedy. Since then, the organization has put on over seventy live sketch comedy shows, both solo and as a collaboration with other student organizations on campus.

== Notable alumni ==
- R. L. Stine, American novelist, producer, screenwriter, and creator of the popular series Goosebumps
- James Thurber, American cartoonist, humorist, journalist, playwright, and author of "The Secret Life of Walter Mitty"
- Milton Caniff, American cartoonist and creator of Terry and the Pirates and Steve Canyon
- Gardner Rea, American cartoonist and one of the first contributing artists to The New Yorker
- Phil Ochs, American singer and songwriter, and figurehead in the 1960s counterculture era
- Mitra Jouhari, Iranian-American comedian, actress, and writer
- Harlan Ellison, American writer
- Paul Palnik, American artist, writer, and editor
- Bill Crawford, American editorial cartoonist
- Joseph W. Papin, American illustrator and political cartoonist
- Lee Adams, writer of Bye Bye Birdie
