= Gardner Rea =

American cartoonist

Gardner Rea (1894 – December 29, 1966) was an American cartoonist, and one of the original contributing artists to The New Yorker. Of Rea, one commentator has written: “He was bawdy without being obscene, absurd without being obscure. His captioned and uncaptioned gags were pithy and true.”

A native of Ironton, Ohio, Rea was born into an artistic family and planned to become a painter. When he was fifteen years old, he sold a gag cartoon to Life magazine.

He attended East High School in Columbus, Ohio and Ohio State University, where he met and befriended James Thurber. Rea played tennis in college and was the editor of the humor magazine, the Sundial, which he had helped to found.

From 1914, he worked as a freelance writer and artist in Manhattan, and contributed to Life and Judge magazines. During World War I, he served in the Chemical Warfare Service.

He began contributing not only drawings and covers but also gags to The New Yorker after it was founded in 1925. Artists such as Charles Addams and Helen Hokinson drew cartoons based on gags written by Rea.

Gardner Rea in the mid 1930s was a regular contributor to the Communist Party's literary magazine "New Masses," with work appearing in nearly every weekly issues in the years 1936 and 1937.
