= Pennsylvania Punch Bowl =

Humor magazine

- Editor: Isabella Schlact (2021-)
- Editor: Sophie Qi (2021-)
- Editor: Jing Jing Piriyalertsak (2021-)
- Categories: Satirical Magazine
- Frequency: Triannual
- Circulation: 5,000
- Publisher: University of Pennsylvania – SAC
- First issue: 1899
- Country: United States
- Based in: Philadelphia
- Language: English
- Website: www.ThePunchBowl.net

The Pennsylvania Punch Bowl, also known colloquially as the Punch Bowl, is a humor magazine published by students at the University of Pennsylvania. The magazine was founded in 1899.

== History ==
The Punch Bowl was founded in 1899 by members of Mask and Wig and the Philomathean Society, making it one of the oldest college humor magazines in the United States. The founders were Daniel Martin Karcher and Edward Burwell Rich.

The magazine was intermittently published during the twentieth century, appearing in only 70 of the 100 years from 1899 to 1999. The magazine is currently printed three to four times a year, coming out each semester and when the new students arrive in the fall. In its earliest days, the Punch Bowl rivaled the Daily Pennsylvanian, an all-around daily student newspaper, and Red and Blue, which contained a mix of news and literary essays. During this time, the Punch Bowl was distributed in local high schools and leading hotels in Philadelphia and in about a dozen other cities on the East Coast. Since its establishment, the Pennsylvania Punch Bowl has termed its members "spoons." In 1930, members were split into "art spoons," "business spoons," and "editorial spoons"; now members are either "little" or "big" spoons depending on their seniority.

In fall 2006, the Punch Bowl created a new website, which adds new humor pieces every day. In addition to its regular set of student columnists, the Punch Bowl features new contributors each Wednesday. Recurring pieces in the magazine and website include "Letter from Amy Gutmann" and "March Madness Voting."

In answer to a question about his advice for the young, University of Pennsylvania alumnus Ezra Pound refers to the Punch Bowl in a 1962 issue of The Paris Review: "In fact the University of Pennsylvania student Punch Bowl used to have as its motto, 'Any damn fool can be spontaneous.'"

== Issues ==
Issue	Year	Season
The Spring Break Issue	2021	Spring
The Apocalypse Issue	2020	Winter
The 2020 Election Issue	2020	Fall
The P-Files: The Conspiracy Mini-Issue	2020	Spring
The National Geographic Issue	2019	Fall
The Dating Issue	2019	Summer
PennMD: The Medicine Issue	2019	Spring
BRO·GUE: The Fashion Issue	2018	Fall
Punch Bowl's Believe It Or Not!	2018	Summer
Punch Bowl 3018	2018	Spring
The Highlights Issue	2017	Winter
The Business Issue	2017	Spring
The 100 Days Issue	2017	Spring
The Election Issue	2016	Fall
The Lifestyle Issue	2016	Spring
The Science Issue	2016	Spring
The 90s Issue	2015	Winter
The NSO Issue	2015	Fall
Arts & Culture Issue	2015	Spring
The Musings Issue	2015	Winter
The NSO Issue	2014	Fall
Food Issue	2014	Spring
Travel Issue	2014	Spring
The Web Issue	2014	Winter
Freshman Number	1985	Spring
Fear and Anxiety	1985	Fall
Travel Number	1984	Fall
Punch Bowl's Definitive Guide to Youth	1984	Winter
Pennhouse	1984	Winter
Exam Issue	1959	Winter

== Controversy ==
As a satire magazine pushing the envelope of what is deemed fit for publishing, the Punch Bowl has found itself at the center of some controversies. As Charles A. Wright, a member of the editorial staff in the early 1920s, noted: “Part of our planning for an issue was to pick a title that, combined with the cover drawing, would create a ‘racy’ effect. ... Our jokes dealt mostly with campus subjects, such as freshmen, football, absent-minded professors, and coeds; and current events, including the beginning of Prohibition, the wearing of knickers, and the popularity of a dance called ‘The Toddle.’”

In 1939, ten Punch Bowl editors were suspended for the printing of ribald humor, causing small riots near 37th and Spruce Streets. Some suspect the Penn vs. Cornell football game may also have magnified the mass student disturbances.

The Winter 2008 Issue - "The ~~Racism~~ Diversity Issue" - attracted attention and created a minor debate on campus because of pieces inside that certain student groups saw as unfairly targeting or aiming a disproportionate number of jokes at certain groups., The University's campus newspaper later criticized these student groups for their overreaction to the issue. To assuage the offended parties and poke fun at the ordeal, the Punch Bowl called their Spring 2008 issue "43% less racist."

== Alumni ==
- Ezra Pound, American poet who was a major figure in the modernism movement
- John Valentine Lovitt, an accomplished lawyer who served in the Navy during World War I and as Expert on International Security Affairs during World War II; served as Editor-in-Chief
- Morton Livingston Schamberg, an American Modernist painter and photographer; served as frequent contributor of illustrations for the magazine
- Leo Yanoff, judge of the Essex County Superior Court; served on the editorial board
