= Princeton Tiger Magazine =

American college humor magazine

The Princeton Tiger
- Editor-in-Chief: Gavin Stroud
- Categories: Humor magazine
- Founded: 1882, Princeton University
- Based in: Princeton, New Jersey
- Language: English
- Website: www.theprincetontiger.com

Princeton Tiger or Tiger Magazine is the second-oldest college humor magazine in the United States, published by Princeton University undergraduates since 1882. It is best known for giving the start to literary and artistic talent as wide-ranging as F. Scott Fitzgerald, John McPhee, Jim Lee, Booth Tarkington. and Tim Ferriss, first publishing the "Man from Nantucket" limerick, and being the first published source using the Tiger as mascot for Princeton.

== History ==
The magazine's style has not remained stagnant over the past 135 years. While the format in the mid-20th century still tended towards humorous, light pieces, the off-campus circulation was broader and the writing reflected it. In recent years, Tiger Magazine has moved to the internet, where it has begun to expand its topics to be more accessible to those outside of Princeton.

Past editorial boards have occasionally published material sufficiently offensive as to spark controversy. Most famous among those controversies was the "Brooke Book" issue of 1983, which satirized an actress named "Brook Shell" who had been purportedly accepted into Princeton—a thinly veiled jab at the real-life actress-model Brooke Shields, shortly after she was accepted into Princeton's class of 1987. While the published material was substantially less obscene than some of the drafts that led to it (see the links below for details), the magazine's graduate board was so disturbed as to fire the top undergraduate officers shortly after the issue was published. The issue became a campus cause célèbre, attracting national news attention.

The March 30, 1893 issue contained the earliest print appearance of the delayed postfixed Not! joke. Tiger Magazine also has the first recorded "There once was a man from Nantucket" limerick.

== Alumni ==
A number of its writers and editors later went on to notable literary or artistic careers.

- Bill Brown
- Robert Caro
- Whitney Darrow, Jr.
- Chip Deffaa
- Tim Ferriss
- F. Scott Fitzgerald
- Joshua Hammer
- David Itzkoff
- Rob Kutner
- Jim Lee
- Aaron Marcus
- Henry Martin
- John McPhee
- Kenneth Offit
- Henry Payne
- John Seabrook
- Bob Smiley
- Booth Tarkington
- Lewis Thomas
- Katrina vanden Heuvel
- Christine Whelan
- Michael Witte
