= Jeff Shesol =

American cartoonist

Presidential Speechwriter
- In office 1998–2001
- President: Bill Clinton

Personal details
- Born: August 6, 1969
- Education: Brown University, B.A. 1991 Oxford University, M.A. 1993
- Occupation: Author, cartoonist, historian, speechwriter
- Awards: Rhodes Scholar

Jeffrey Allen Shesol (born August 6, 1969, in Columbus, Ohio, US) is an American historian, speechwriter, and comic strip author. He served as a speechwriter for President Bill Clinton and is now a partner at West Wing Writers, a speechwriting and strategy firm in Washington, D.C.

As a White House speechwriter from 1998 to 2001, Shesol took a lead role on two State of the Union Addresses, the President's 2000 Democratic National Convention speech, and the Farewell Address. His hundreds of other speeches covered a range of issues, including economic policy, global health, the federal budget, and the arts. Shesol also helped produce the noted mockumentary "The Final Days" for Clinton's appearance at the 2000 White House Correspondents' Association Dinner.

From 1994 to 1998, Shesol wrote the nationally syndicated political-satirical comic strip "Thatch". In 1997, he published his first book, Mutual Contempt: Lyndon Johnson, Robert Kennedy, and the Feud That Defined a Decade, about the rivalry between Lyndon Johnson and Bobby Kennedy. In 2010, Shesol published his second book, Supreme Power: Franklin Roosevelt vs. the Supreme Court, about President Franklin D. Roosevelt's court-packing plan.

In 2002, Shesol was the Anschutz Distinguished Fellow in American Studies at Princeton University, teaching a course on the history of the presidential speech. He has written essays and articles in his own name for publications including The New York Times, The Washington Post, and Politico. He also offers regular commentary on television and radio.

Shesol graduated from Brown University in 1991 before earning his master's degree in history from Oxford University as a Rhodes Scholar. He lives in Washington, D.C., with his wife and children.

== Bibliography ==
External videos
- Presentation by Shesol on Mutual Contempt, October 5, 1997, C-SPAN
- Booknotes interview with Shesol on Mutual Contempt, November 30, 1997, C-SPAN
- Presentation by Shesol on Supreme Power, March 23, 2010, C-SPAN

- Mutual Contempt: Lyndon Johnson, Robert Kennedy, and the Feud That Defined a Decade, W. W. Norton & Company, London/New York 1998 ISBN 0-393-31855-9
- Supreme Power: Franklin Roosevelt vs. The Supreme Court, W. W. Norton & Company, London/New York 2010 ISBN 978-0-393-33881-2 (Paperback)
