= ... Not! =

Grammatical construction in the English language

... Not! is a grammatical construction in the English language used as a function word to make negative a group of words or a word. It became a sardonic catchphrase in North America and elsewhere in the 1990s. A declarative statement is made, followed by a pause, and then an emphatic "not!" adverb is postfixed. The result is a surprise negation of the original declarative statement.

According to the above, the phrase, "He is a nice guy... not!" is synonymous to "He is not a nice guy". Whereas the latter structure is a neutral observation, the former expresses rather an annoyance, and is most often used jocularly.

One of the earliest uses was in the Princeton Tiger (March 30, 1893) 103: "An Historical Parallel-- Not." In 1905, it was used in the comic strip Dream of the Rarebit Fiend by Winsor McCay. A 1918 instance was "I am darn sorry not to be able to help you out with the News Letter, but in me you have a fund of information—NOT."

Popularized in North America in the 1990s by the Saturday Night Live sketch and subsequent film Wayne's World, "not" was selected as the 1992 Word of the Year by the American Dialect Society.

The "Not!" catchphrase was the basis of a scene in the 2006 film Borat, in which a lecturer in humour attempted to explain the grammatical construction to Borat Sagdiyev with limited success.

== See also ==
- Privative, a particle that inverts the meaning of the word stem to which it is affixed.
