= John Butman =

American writer

John Campbell Butman (1951 – March 23, 2020) was an American writer. He wrote several books under his own name and collaborated on more than thirty other titles, including works that were bestsellers in lists compiled by The New York Times and The Boston Globe and Economist award winners.

== Background ==
Butman graduated with a degree in film direction from New York University's Tisch School of the Arts in 1972. He founded the content development firm Idea Platforms, Inc. in 1989, which advises and collaborates with leading thinkers, strategists, and content experts in the development of ideas, creation of books, and building of idea platforms. He was an affiliated literary agent with the Boston-based firm Kneerim & Williams. He lived in Portland, Maine.

== Bibliography ==
- (with Simon Targett) New World, Inc: The Making of America by England's Merchant Adventurers (Little, Brown and Company, 2018) ISBN 978-0316307888
- Breaking Out: How To Build Influence in a World of Competing Ideas (Harvard Business Review Press, 2013) ISBN 978-1422172803
- Townie (Permanent Press, 2002) ISBN 978-1579620806
- Juran: A Lifetime of Influence (John Wiley & Sons, 1997) ISBN 978-0-47117-210-9
- The Book That's Sweeping America! Or, Why I Love Business! (John Wiley & Sons, Inc., 1997) ISBN 978-0471173984
