= The Shady Dealer =

Humor publication of Univ. of Chicago

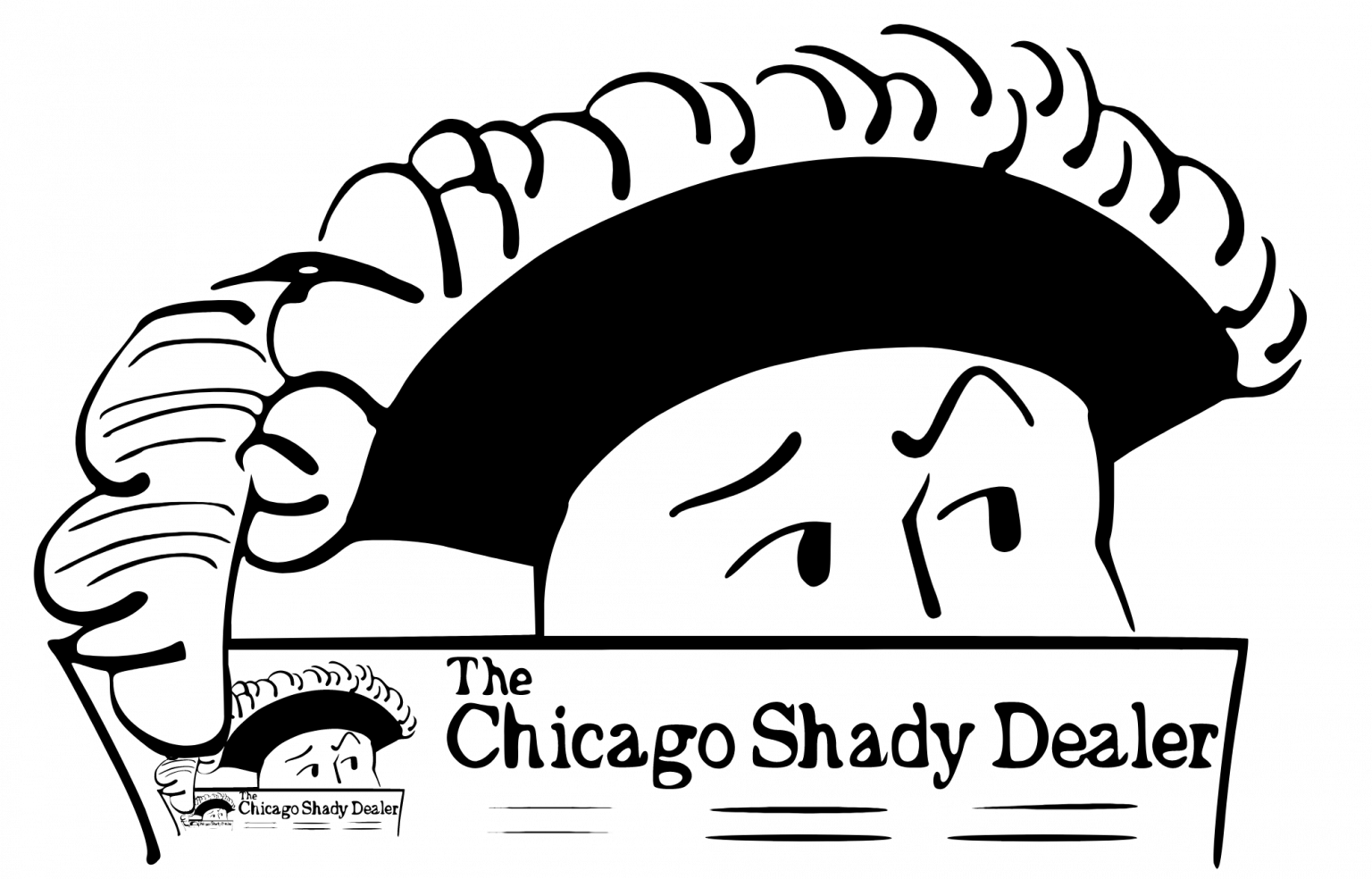
- The Shady Dealer's masthead
- Categories: Humor
- Frequency: Quarterly
- First issue: Spring 2005
- Country: United States
- Based in: Chicago
- Language: English
- Website: chicagoshadydealer.com

The Shady Dealer is the humor magazine of the University of Chicago.

== Overview ==
The Shady Dealer was founded in 2004 as "the only intentional humor publication of the University of Chicago". According to John W. Boyer's The University of Chicago: A History, the turn of the millennium was the ideal time for new student organizations because the university was aiming to expand its undergraduate enrollment to 4,500 students. Boyer notes that "[t]o inch up to the target of 4,500 and stop would have been the equivalent of Patton's forces exploiting the Avranches breakthrough in Normandy and then stopping halfway to Paris. The goal was to reach Paris."

The university was thus incentivized to enrich its undergraduate student life by increasing the amount of on-campus housing. This in turn led to "a more vibrant, self-starting milieu of student life--the complex matrix of student clubs, organizations, causes, initiatives, and even occasional protests."

The first issue of The Shady Dealer was released in May 2005. Modeled after The Onion, it publishes and distributes issues across campus quarterly, as well as through its website and social media. The main goal of its satire is "punching up", or social criticism directed at "entities more powerful than us".

In addition to its satirical articles, The Shady Dealer is responsible for several other projects throughout the year, including April Fools' Day pranks and Datamatch, a Valentine's Day matchmaking project that pairs students through an online survey. In a 2023 survey of campus publications, The Chicago Maroon called The Shady Dealer an "uncategorizable" publication because of its "true UChicago quirky fashion" and wide range of special projects and other "stunts".

== Controversy ==
=== Initial distribution ===
The Shady Dealer's first issue, released May 2005, was distributed within another campus publication, The Chicago Weekly, without The Chicago Weekly's permission. According to The Shady Dealer's founding editor-in-chief, Zachary Binney, the editorial staff was not responsible for the incident. Binney speculated that "overzealous writers" placed copies of The Shady Dealer inside copies of The Chicago Weekly but nevertheless apologized to the editors of The Chicago Weekly.

=== "Free Expression" condoms ===
In 2018, The Shady Dealer sold 500 condoms, each with the words "Free Expression" printed on the packaging, as a fundraiser. The condoms were sold for $1.50 each, despite complaints that the university already provides condoms to its students for free. In response, The Shady Dealer noted that the condoms were "definitely real", that "[e]very single one of the precious little squares represents the First Amendment, represents free speech, represents the greatest country in the world" and that "the beauty of these condoms is that they let you express yourself in a safe space without any consequences".

=== COVID-19 issue ===
In 2021, The Chicago Maroon dismissed two staffers for sharing internal files with The Shady Dealer. The staffers downloaded files from The Maroon's then-unpublished COVID-19 special issue, and The Shady Dealer plagiarized article ideas and headlines to create their own COVID-19 special issue. The Maroon requested a public apology, and The Shady Dealer responded by saying that they found The Maroon's articles "buried somewhere in the Podesta emails, the Panama Papers", and that "we actually retain a psychic medium on our staff, paid through our RSO [Registered Student Organization] budget". The Shady Dealer further promised that "[w]e definitely won't do it again, because it will not be funny a second time".

Other students saw the conflict between The Maroon and The Shady Dealer as a symptom of both publications "taking themselves too seriously," in the words of student Andrew Farry. In a viewpoint article in The Maroon, Farry argued that the incident was proof that "the only idea [The Shady Dealer has] is that [it has] no ideas" and that "Shady needs some fresh blood". However, Farry also observed that "The Maroon is a student paper. No one's careers are at stake here. The Maroon's 'staffers' are college kids freely using their spare time. ... The whole situation is ridiculous, but it reveals how easy it is to lose perspective."
