= The Brown Daily Herald =

Student newspaper in Rhode Island, US

- The front page of The Brown Daily Herald on March 19, 2014
- Type: Daily student newspaper
- Format: Broadsheet
- Owner(s): The Brown Daily Herald, Inc.
- Publisher: Trustees of The Brown Daily Herald
- President: Cate Latimer
- Managing editor: Ciara Meyer, Elise Haulund, and Claire Song
- Founded: 1866
- Language: English
- Headquarters: Providence, Rhode Island
- Circulation: 4,000
- Website: browndailyherald.com
- Free online archives: browndailyherald.com/archives/

The Brown Daily Herald is the student newspaper of Brown University in Providence, Rhode Island.

Established in 1866 and published daily since 1891, The Herald is the second-oldest student newspaper among America's college dailies. It is financially and editorially independent of the University, and publishes Monday through Friday during the academic year with additional issues during commencement, summer and orientation. The Herald is managed by a board of trustees comprising two editorial staffers, two business staffers and five Herald alumni. Many alumni of The Brown Daily Herald have gone on to careers in journalism, and several have won Pulitzer Prizes.

== History ==
=== Early years ===
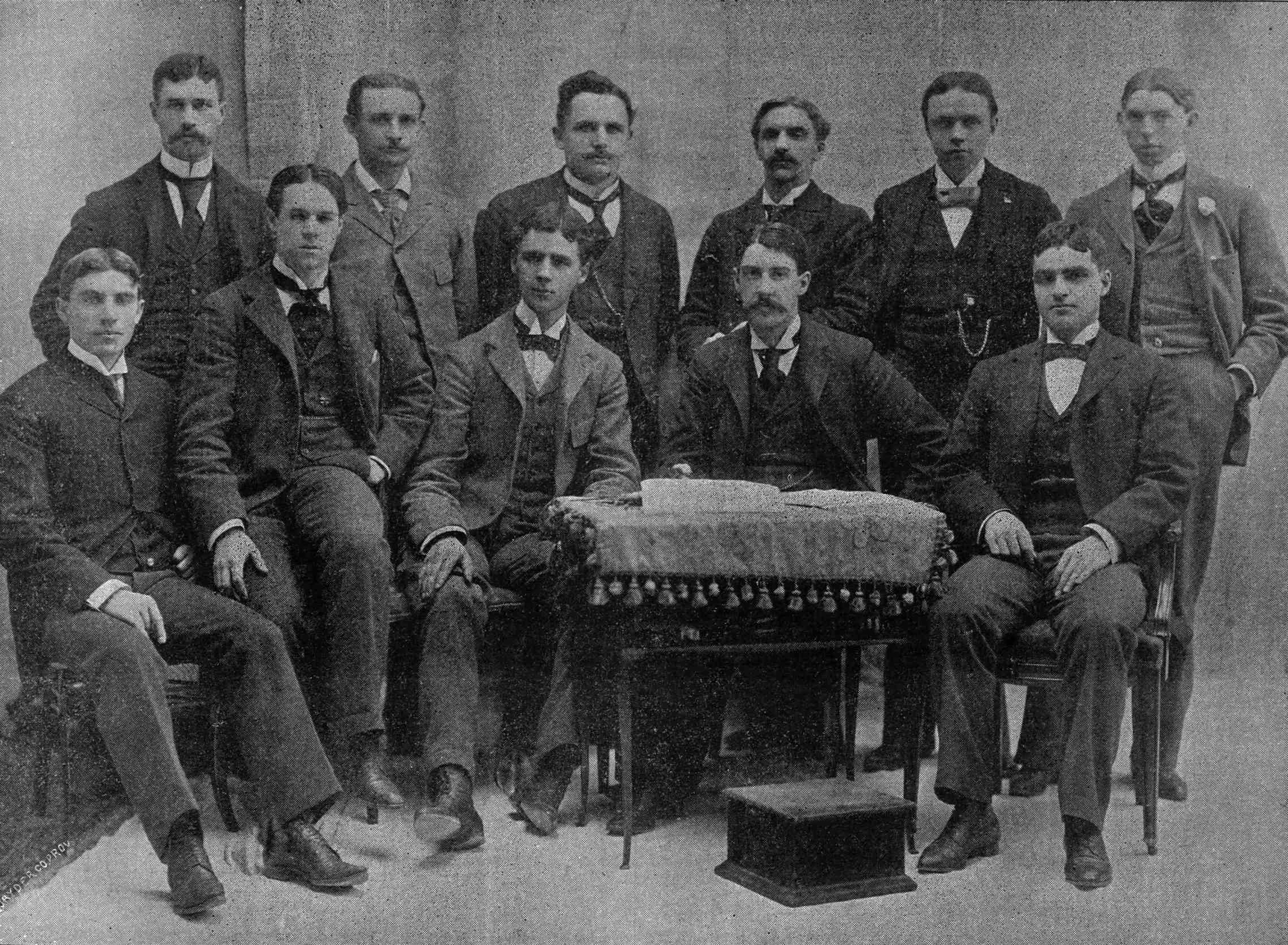
A photograph of the Herald's staff for the 1893–1894 school year

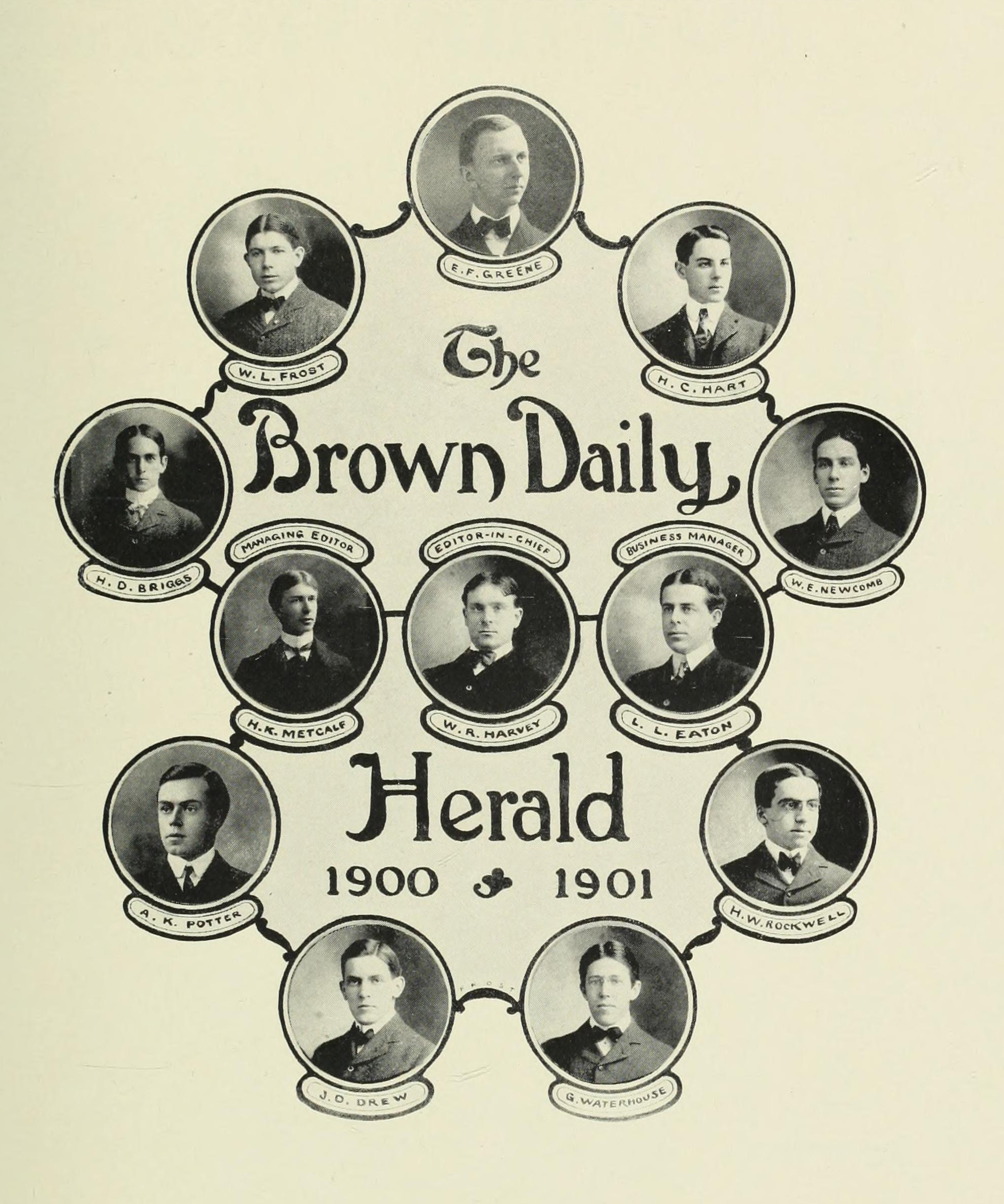
The Brown Daily Herald's staff for the 1900–1901 school year

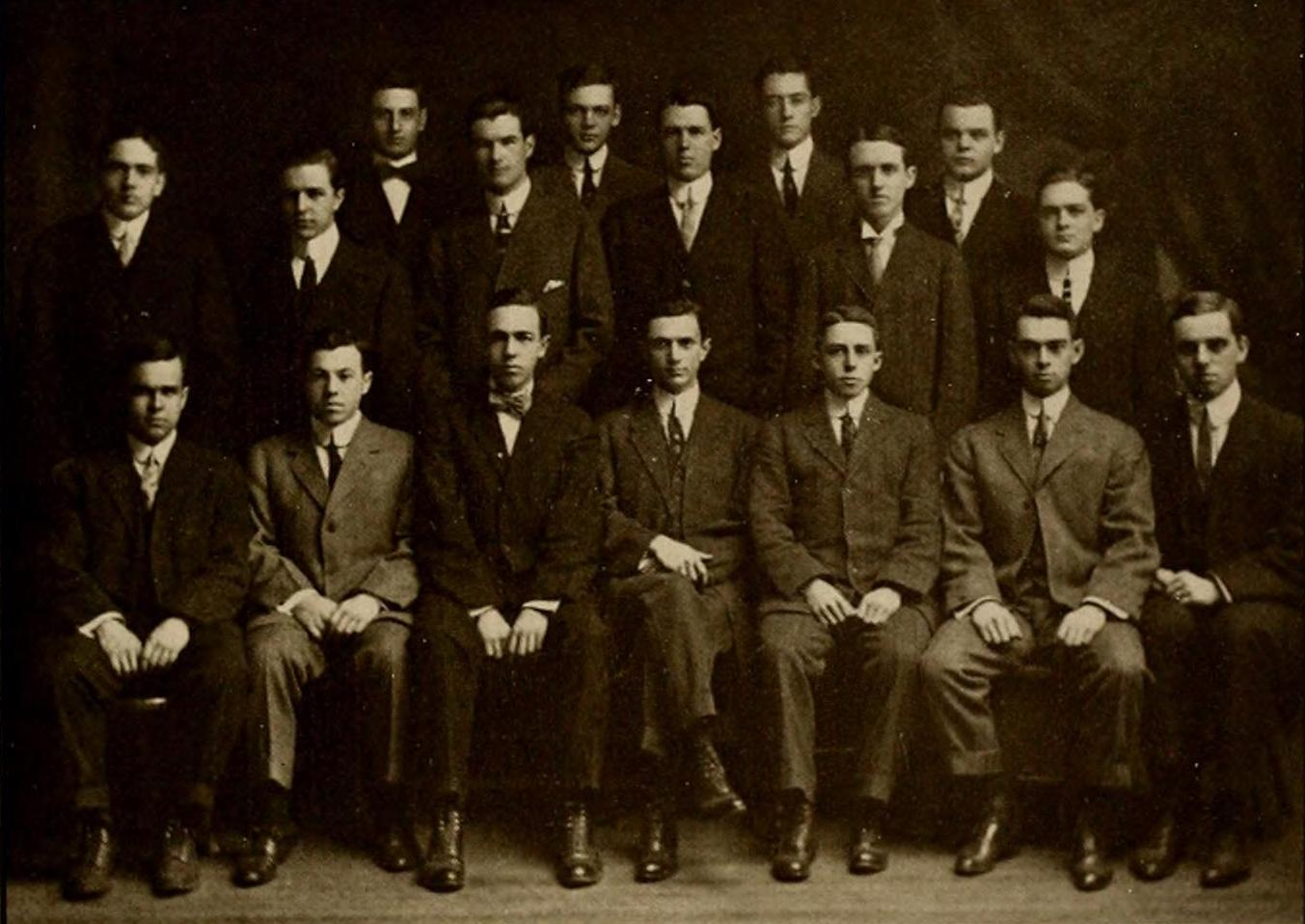
The Board of The Brown Daily Herald for the year of 1909–1910

The Herald first appeared on Wednesday, December 2, 1891. The first issue was printed during the night and copies were distributed to each door in the dormitories with no preliminary announcement. The secret planning for the paper was actually begun about a month earlier by Ted Baylies (Class of 1895) and George Hunter (Class of 1895), who, as readers of The Harvard Crimson and The Yale Daily News, were convinced that they could put out a daily newspaper at Brown.

They enlisted the help of John (Class of 1893) and Edward Casey (Class of 1893), who were putting themselves through college in their printing shop at the foot of College Hill. Baylies and Steve Hopkins (Class of 1893) rounded up advertising for the whole year to insure the financial soundness of their proposed venture. Ben Johnson (Class of 1893), H. Anthony Dyer (Class of 1894), and Guy A. Andrews (Class of 1895) were also named to the board of editors. The approval of 8th University President Elisha Benjamin Andrews and other faculty members was obtained before the first issue appeared.

The four-page paper was printed at the Casey shop on a single-cylinder press operated by a wheel, mostly by the labor of the editors after they discovered that the tramp printer they had hired was given to drinking. The price of the paper was two cents a copy or $1.50 per year. The Herald received a cool reception from the Brunonian, which in 1890 had welcomed the Brown Magazine as a new literary publication and devoted its own pages to news, but had rejected the idea of daily publication. A Brunonian editorial criticized the appearance of the Herald, and stated:

There is not sufficient news in a college of our size to support a first-class daily, and anything less is an expensive luxery [sic].

The Herald survived and even began to have a social life, holding its first banquet at the Crown Hotel in 1903, and playing the first of a long series of annual baseball games against the Brunonian in 1907. As a supporter of Charles Evans Hughes 1881 for president in 1916, the Herald happily and in large print proclaimed his victory on November 8, 1916 before learning that he had actually lost the election.

=== World War I ===
The Herald dropped the word "Daily" in May 1917 when publication was limited to three days a week. In the fall of 1918 the paper became a semi-weekly. On February 1, 1919, daily publication was resumed. During the war, letters from alumni in the service were featured.

=== 1920s ===
After the war, the paper turned its attention to other matters, printing a green issue for St. Patrick's Day in 1920, and on January 20, 1921, an editorial on the immoral behavior of Brown students and their dates, the "social buds", who came to Brown dances and checked their corsets with the hat-check attendant. The editorial provoked replies and received a whole page of coverage in the Boston American. The Literary Supplement of the Brown Daily Herald, a twelve-page collection of poetry and short pieces of prose, priced at fifteen cents, made two appearances, in April and May 1921, and then disappeared.

For some reason, in December 1921, when the Herald was celebrating its thirtieth anniversary, the masthead began to include the words, "Founded in 1866, Daily since 1891." The reason for the determination of this date of "founding" is uncertain. Perhaps the Herald decided to adopt its rival, the Brunonian—with which it had coexisted—as an antecedent. The Herald would then be able to stretch its life back to 1866, when another Brunonian, this one a rival of the Brown Paper, appeared. On October 19, 1924, a newspaper appeared with the title, Brown Daily Drivel, a single issue printed by students as a travesty of The Brown Daily Herald. In later years, the Herald issued its own comic papers, often on April Fools' Day, a tradition that continues today.

=== World War II ===
In 1933, the Herald caused a considerable stir by launching an editorial campaign urging students at Brown and at other colleges to sign petitions pledging "not to bear arms except when the country is invaded." An unexpected result was the appointment by the Rhode Island General Assembly of a committee "to investigate the University and to provide penalties for disloyalty to the State and Nation." The response of the students was to raise the number of pledges to 700. The peace drive spread to other colleges and soon an Intercollegiate Disarmament Council was inviting colleges across the country to join the peace movement.

The university administration, while not in favor of the stand, did not interfere, and the legislative committee concluded that there was no need to suppress the movement as there was no evidence of a connection with disloyal organizations outside the University. When a destructive hurricane struck New England on September 21, 1938, during freshman week, eight upperclassmen who were on campus to greet the freshmen managed to get out by candlelight a mimeographed one-page edition of the Herald, followed by a similar two-page issue the next day.

During World War II, The Brown Daily Herald again suspended publication on January 12, 1943. From March 10 to August 13, 1943 the paper was published weekly and called the Brown Herald. From August 20, 1943 to October 5, 1945 the weekly Brown Herald-Record replaced the Brown Herald and the Pembroke Record, and during that time had a woman editor, Audrey Mishel '44. In September 1947, when the Herald resumed daily publication, it published a magazine called Midnight, a manual of sorts for the Herald staff. The title came from the paper's deadline.

=== 1950s–1960s ===
Since September 1947, The Brown Daily Herald has been published regularly. However, its duration is not as long as its numbering suggests, having been inadvertently extended on January 18, 1959, when the volume number abruptly changed from 68 to 88, an error on which all subsequent numbering has been based. The Brown Daily Herald Supplement was first published on September 28, 1959. The contents of the first issue were an interesting assortment—a review of Lady Chatterley's Lover (recently reissued in the United States, where it had been banned), photographs of life on South Main Street (identified on the cover as "Slums"), an article on the prospects of the Ivy League season, an article on new chairman of the National Republican Congressional Committee, and a cartoon by Jules Feiffer.

The Supplement continued to be a weekly (although not always on the same day of the week) publication until 1963. The Brown Herald Review, containing literary pieces, art, and book reviews, was published eight times during the academic year from October 1963 until January 1966. A hoax issue of the Herald which went wrong was that of December 6, 1965, with its oversized headline, "Pembrokers Get Apartments; Experiment Begins in Spring," and related stories. The next day, Editor-in-Chief M. Charles Bakst '66 and two managing editors resigned, stating that in conceiving the hoax issue they had believed that it "would be humorous in the short-run and conducive in the long run to a more thorough discussion of Pembroke's residential and social system."

In fact, their stories had been taken at face value by some students, faculty, and administration, who were not amused. On March 27, 1964, a similar effort proclaiming "Pembroke No Longer 'Coordinate'; Corporation Makes Brown 'Co-ed'" and "Keeney Selects Special Committee to Supervise 'Herald'" had brought forth no more than a cheerful communication to the managing board from President Keeney, probably because of the proximity to April Fools' Day.

=== 1960s–1990s ===
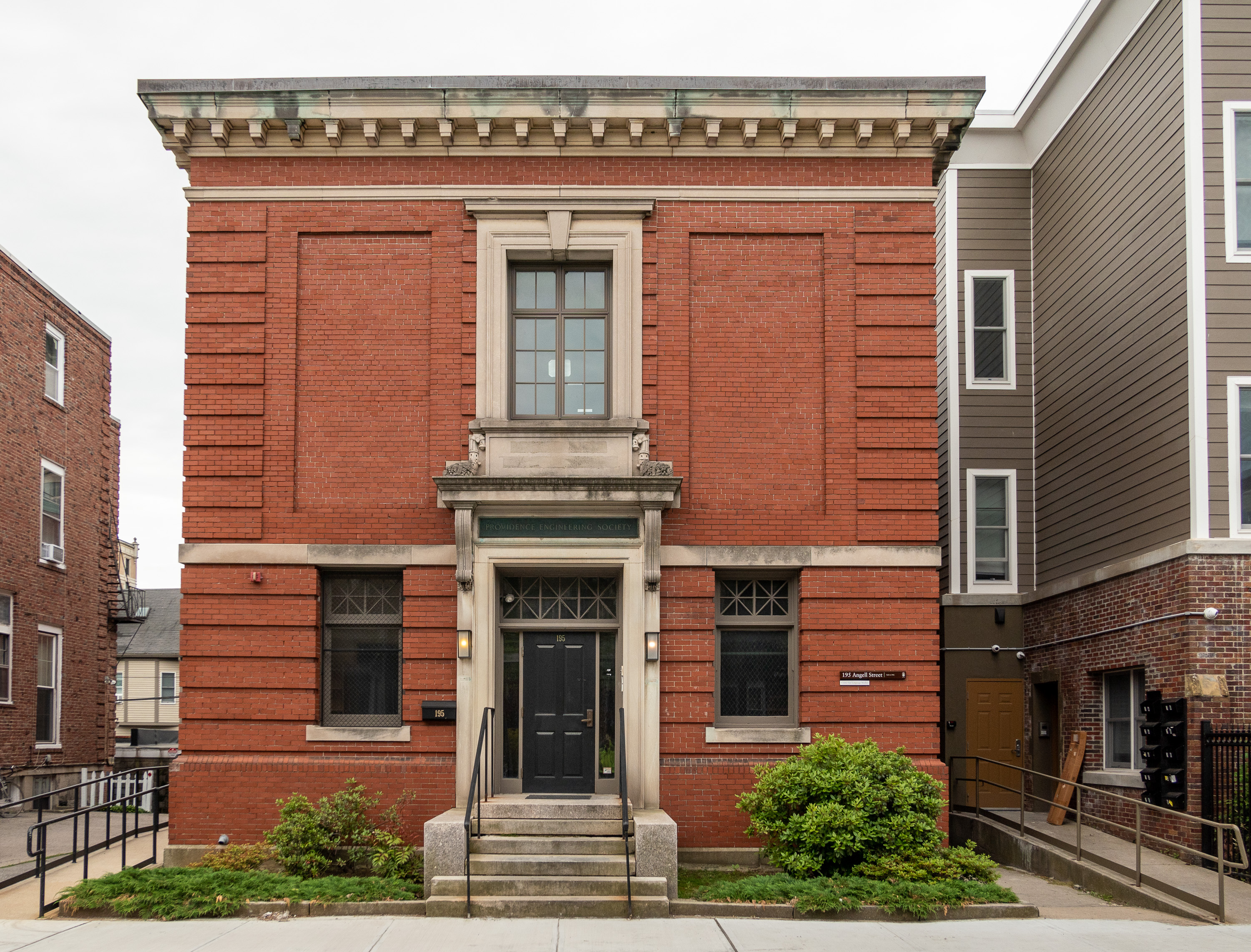
From 1969 to 2019, the Herald's offices were located at 195 Angell St.

In 1968, Beverly Hodgson '70 was acclaimed by the press as the "First Woman Editor of Ivy League Daily" (and coincidentally later married the nephew of Audrey Mishel, the woman editor of the Herald-Record of World War II), and with her managing editor, another woman, Laura Hersh '70, got the Herald out from its new offices at 195 Angell Street. In 1973, The Brown Daily Herald Voluntary Publishing Association, which took in outside printing jobs as well as publishing the Herald, was facing financial difficulties after purchasing typesetting equipment.

The solution was the founding of Fresh Fruit, a college-oriented tabloid with distribution to eight college campuses and the potential for generating advertising income. Its first appearance was in The Brown Daily Herald of February 15, 1973. In February 1975, an editorial staff separate from that of the Herald took over the publication of Fresh Fruit. The Herald, still in debt after a 1974 operating loss of $10,000, began an alumni subscription drive, filed claims against its creditors, and sought incorporation under the laws of Rhode Island.

With the Commencement issue of 1975, The Brown Daily Herald Voluntary Publishing Association became The Brown Daily Herald, Inc. In 1985, the Herald entered into a contract with the Undergraduate Council of Students, in which UCS agreed to purchase 5,500 subscriptions at five dollars each for every member of the student body, though UCS later cancelled this contract and the Herald has been free since. A weekend insert called Good Clean Fun was added in 1986.

In September 1989, a new supplement, intended to be monthly, appeared under the title, In Depth. Editor-in-chief of the Herald Amy Bach expressed the hope that the new supplement would serve as a forum for the thorough exploration of one topic each month. The first issue was devoted to articles on depression, the second to Providence's neighborhoods. On November 2, 1991, The Brown Daily Herald held a one-hundredth anniversary celebration, at which William Kovach was the keynote speaker.

== Today's Herald ==
=== Sections ===
The Herald is organized into four sections:

1. News
The largest section of the newspaper, "News" covers University news—stories directly affecting the Brown community, from student life, to prominent speakers, to administrative changes—metro news—stories central to Providence and its surrounding cities, ranging from Rhode Island state legislation to government-related student protest, including the goings on of local restaurants and shops—and science and research—stories regarding research of both science and humanities professors as well as general science topics and news on campus. The University News, Metro and Science & Research sections were consolidated into the News section under the 126th Editorial Board.

2. Arts & Culture
With reports and reviews of on-campus plays, films, and art exhibitions and installations, the Arts & Culture section is a soft news alternative to the typically straightforward and sharp News section. It appears Wednesday and Friday.
3. Sports
A blend of opinion and match coverage, the Sports section covers intercollegiate competitions, profiles individual players, and offers opinions on professional sports teams and leagues.

4. Commentary
Comprising letters and op-eds, Commentary appears daily. The editorial page contains a staff editorial, as well as letters to the editor.

=== Post- magazine ===
Post- is the Herald's weekly arts and culture magazine, running each Thursday. Its name originally referenced the academic convention of using "post-" as a prefix—as in "post-modernism" and "post-structuralism"—to indicate transcending older modes of thought.

Post- regularly contains film, television, and music reviews, editorials on Brown University's arts scene, and two sex columns called "Sexpertise", one written by a male and one by a female. It also includes colorful commentary on current events.

=== Herald style ===
The Herald has a unique style. The paper references academic departments, faculty titles, University campaigns, and organizations abbreviated by acronyms so regularly that it has several case-specific policies for references. The Herald does not employ the serial comma, and favors the word "said" after a quote over "mentioned", "pointed out", etc.

Generally the Herald defaults to the Associated Press style, and therefore keeps numerous copies of the AP Stylebook on hand in its office.

=== Staff ===
The Brown Daily Herald employs over 250 voluntary staff members, who work as editors, business managers, reporters, designers, photographers, and artists. Cate Latimer is the Editor-in-Chief and also serves as president of The Brown Daily Herald Inc., and Ciara Meyer is managing editor and vice president.

==== Editorial board ====
The editorial board manages the Herald and is responsible for its daily production. Members usually serve for the spring of their junior year and the fall of their senior year. The board usually consists of between three and seven positions. In recent years, positions on the board have included Editors-in-Chief, Managing Editors, and Senior Editors.

The Herald is currently under its 136th editorial board. For this reason, the members of the board are collectively referred to as "136" (pronounced "one-thirty-six"). The members of the 136th editorial board are: Editor-in-Chief Cate Latimer '27, Managing Editor Ciara Meyer '27, Managing Editor Elise Haulund '27, Managing Editor Claire Song '27, Senior Editor Hadley Carr '27, Senior Editor Paul Hudes '27, and Senior Editor Max Robinson '26.5.

==== Business ====
Because the Herald is independent of Brown University, it must generate revenue to sustain itself. The business staff does so mainly through soliciting advertisements in the paper. Additionally, the Herald offers daily and weekly subscriptions to the newspaper, and fills around 30 subscriptions each week. Currently, the staff consists of an executive management team, staff members, and one paid employee.

==== Production ====
The production staff of the Herald is responsible for the technical aspects of putting out the day's paper. They design the layout of the paper with Adobe InDesign, copy edit the articles, and post content to the Web.

==== Section editors ====
Each of the Herald's sections is managed by two or more section editors.

=== Web presence ===
In 1995, the Herald became one of the first college newspapers in the United States to publish itself online as well as in print. The newspaper is published each day at www.browndailyherald.com—where it can be viewed at no cost to the user—and is divided into sections for easy browsing. All pictures and comics appearing in the paper are also uploaded.

The Web site has informative sections about the Herald itself, including "About the Herald", an FAQ, and contact information. It also announces scheduled meetings and provides means for students to get involved, alumni to subscribe, and people or companies to place advertisements in the paper. Additionally, an archives section organizes and makes available each volume of the Herald since March 12, 2004.

Over the winter break of December 2006/January 2007, the Herald's Web site was redesigned with ease of reading and a "clean" feel in mind. The home page was changed to display not only the leading stories but also to list every article appearing in the day's volume. Also, many of the darker colors of the previous site were replaced with white, once again emphasizing a cleaner feel. Additionally, a PDF document of the current print edition's front page became available for download at the bottom of the home page.

The Web site underwent a second major redesign in April 2009 during the week before Spring Weekend. The changes include a new banner and layout and navigation scheme that more prominently displays advertisements. The Web site is still supported by College Publisher.

=== Office ===
The Herald's offices are at 88 Benevolent Street, where it shares space with WBRU, Brown University's student-run radio station, which sold its signal in 2017 but continues to broadcast online. The Herald moved there in 2020 from 195 Angell Street, its home for a half-century.

=== 9-Spot ===
Each Thursday night, the Herald's editorial board hosts a meeting at 9:00 p.m. for all Herald staff, at which staffers offer story ideas and talk about whatever is happening outside of the office. The editors spend much of their time at the Herald office, so they rely on the staff members at 9-spot to contribute a number of story ideas.

== Controversies ==
=== Accusations of treason, communism ===
In the early 1930s, the Herald began a pacifist movement called "War Against War". The paper launched an editorial campaign urging Brown students to sign petitions pledging "not to bear arms except when the country is invaded." The movement spread across the country and gained popularity in college papers large and small, which quickly endorsed the Herald's actions. When Rhode Island officials caught wind of the campaign, they immediately grew suspicious and appointed a committee "to investigate the University and to provide penalties for disloyalty to the United States."

The result was a resolution—passed unanimously by the Rhode Island General Assembly—accusing the Herald of treason and associating the paper with the Communist movement. Providence attorney William Needham, himself a graduate of Brown's class of 1915, called the War Against War campaign "a foreign movement of communistic tendencies."

Throughout the process, the Brown administration did not interfere in the legislative action, citing freedom of expression and freedom of the press.

In the end, the committee concluded that the Herald and its campaign were not serious enough threats to warrant suppression or any further action, as there was no connection between the Herald and disloyal organizations.

=== David Horowitz advertisement ===
In 2001, the Herald ran an advertisement placed by conservative writer and activist David Horowitz, entitled "Ten Reasons Why Reparations for Blacks is a Bad Idea for Blacks—and Racist, Too!" The advertisement had circulated around many college newspapers, but most rejected it, including The Harvard Crimson and the Columbia Daily Spectator. The Herald's editors at the time—Katherine Boas, Brooks King, Patrick Moos, and Jahred Adelman—decided that if the ad was sent to them, they would run it.

The ad appeared in the March 13, 2001 edition of the Herald, and was met with shock and criticism. Among its ten points, the ad stated that Americans should be the last to pay reparations because slavery had existed worldwide for centuries before white American Christians intervened. It also stated that African-Americans were the richest and most privileged black people alive.

On March 14, over 60 students came to the Herald office demanding to speak to the newspaper's leadership, and met face to face with the Herald editors. The following day, a coalition of student groups distributed a petition around campus that condemned the Herald's decision to print the ad and demanded that the paper give $725—the amount they believed Horowitz had paid for the ad—to minority groups on campus. In addition, the petition called for the Herald to give the coalition a free full-page ad to "educate the greater Brown community on related issues."

The editors refused to give in, setting off a chain reaction of events that shook the University.

On the morning of March 15, coalition members took 4,000 copies of the Herald from 10 distribution points. In place of the newspapers, they left a flyer stating: "We are using this action as an opportunity to show our community at Brown that our newspaper is not accountable to its supposed constituents. It is a newspaper run by Brown-student opportunists and careerists who are completely unaccountable to the University's aims and its student body."

the Herald responded on March 16, a Saturday, by reprinting 1,000 copies of the stolen Friday paper. Herald staffers distributed them by hand to students in the lobby of the Sharpe Refectory (a.k.a. the Ratty), the largest dining hall on campus.

That same day, the University issued a statement supporting the Herald: "Consistent with its commitment to the free exchange of ideas, the University recognizes and supports the Herald's right to publish any material it chooses, even if that material is objectionable to members of the campus community." Sheila Blumstein, then Interim President of the University, later told the Herald that she supported the free exchange of ideas and that the Herald had a right to print the ad. But she said Herald staff may not have handled the issue as diplomatically as they could have.

National newspapers caught wind of the controversy and covered the story. The New York Times, The Washington Post, and ABC News, all ran stories about events on campus.

The furor surrounding the events later died down, with neither party reaching an agreement. The Herald still maintains that its actions were protected under freedom of the press.

A Slavery and Justice Committee was formed a few years after. Though Jim Campbell, chairman of the Committee, was one of the Herald's detractors, and the Committee considered reparations as part of its agenda, there is no official connection between the Committee and the events surrounding the advertisement.

In March 2011, on the 10th anniversary of the reparations advertisement, an ad about the Israeli-Palestinian conflicts for Horowitz' website www.walloflies.org was published in the Herald leading to another campus-wide controversy. Though the controversy quickly died down, graffiti stating "The BDH is racist" remained on sidewalks on and around campus.

== Notable Herald alumni ==
- Jacob Appel (Class of 1995): bioethicist
- Rebecca Ballhaus (Class of 2013): journalist, winner of the 2019 Pulitzer Prize for National Reporting
- Aaron T. Beck (Class of 1942): founder of the Beck Institute for Cognitive Behavior Therapy at the University of Pennsylvania
- David Corn (Class of 1981): Washington, D.C. bureau chief for Mother Jones
- William A. Dyer (Class of 1924): former general manager and president of the Indianapolis Star
- John Ghazvinian (Class of 1996): journalist and petroleum expert
- Richard Holbrooke (Class of 1962): former United States Ambassador to the United Nations and former Envoy for Pakistan and Afghanistan.
- Jonathan Karp (Class of 1986): publisher, CEO of Simon & Schuster
- Brian Lies (Class of 1985): author and illustrator
- Usha Lee McFarling (Class of 1989): winner of the 2007 Pulitzer Prize for Explanatory Reporting
- George Musser (Class of 1988): author and editor at Scientific American
- Steven Rattner (Class of 1974): Deputy Chairman and Deputy CEO, Lazard Frères & Co.
- James Risen (Class of 1977): journalist for The Intercept, winner of the 2006 Pulitzer Prize for National Reporting
- Jeff Shesol (Class of 1991): cartoonist, Thatch; scriptwriter for Bill Clinton
- Michael J. Silverstein (Class of 1976): managing director at the Boston Consulting Group
- Judith Warner (Class of 1987): author
- Craig Waters (Class of 1979): journalist, author, communications director for the Florida Supreme Court
- Janet Yellen (Class of 1967): economist, former chair of the Federal Reserve and current Secretary of the Treasury for the United States

== See also ==
- The Brown Jug
- The Brown Noser
