= The Brown Noser =

Brown University's undergraduate satirical newspaper

- Type: Satirical newspaper
- Owner: Brown University
- Editor-in-chief: Sebastian Botero; Lauren Duncan; Grace Freeman; Tatsuya King; Henry Lew; Satvik Narang
- Founded: December 2006
- Headquarters: Providence, Rhode Island
- Website: http://www.thenoser.com

The Brown Noser (also known as The Noser) is an undergraduate satirical newspaper at Brown University in Providence, Rhode Island.

== Overview ==
Founded in 2006, The Brown Noser is Brown University's second oldest humor publication (behind The Brown Jug, founded in 1920). They provide a comedic take on university news as well as outside events.

== History ==
When The Brown Noser's founders first applied to the Board of the Undergraduate Council of Students to request a financial endowment for publishing, they were denied funding. The founders then stormed the Undergraduate Council of Students meetings covered in body paint until they received funding sufficient to print The Noser five times a semester. The first article was "Brown Noser to Replace Daily Herald as Campus's Premier Comedy Newspaper," a joke on Brown University's oldest publication, The Brown Daily Herald.

In Fall 2009, The Noser adopted and revived The Brown Jug, the student satirical magazine founded in 1920. The Jug features humorous content which mocks popular culture, fashion trends, politics, humorous illustrations, and events around the Brown University's campus. The Noser is part of a collective of Brown comedy groups, along with Improvidence, Starla and Sons, Out of Bounds, and The Brown Jug, known as the "Brown Barrel."

== Issues ==
The Brown Noser publishes six times per year and unloads hundreds of copies within hours of its release by stationing writers at frequented campus intersections. The Noser is printed in Seekonk, MA by TCI Press.

== Notable alumni ==
- Ian Spector, humorist known for creating internet phenomenon "Chuck Norris facts"
- Hugh Hewitt, contributor Washington Post

== See also ==
- The Brown Jug
- The Brown Daily Herald
