= The Medium (Rutgers) =

- Logo for The Medium
- Type: Weekly student paper
- Format: Paper
- Founded: 1970
- Headquarters: New Brunswick, New Jersey, U.S.
- Website: Rutgers The Medium

The Medium is a student newspaper at Rutgers University in New Brunswick, New Jersey. The newspaper is a student-run weekly satire and comedy publication. Founded in 1970 as The Livingston Medium, it is the second-largest circulation newspaper at Rutgers University after The Daily Targum, the university's student newspaper. The publication describes itself as the "Entertainment Weekly of Rutgers University", the more recent incarnations of The Medium focus on satirical and humorous articles based on current events, popular culture, and events on the Rutgers campuses. Since 1970, the newspaper has been headquartered on Livingston Campus.

The newspaper has a traditional focus on promoting free speech. The Medium frequently defends their right to publish offensive material under the First Amendment, specifically the freedom of speech and freedom of the press. The Medium has sparked frequent protests from the student body and pressure from the administration over material they have published.

== History ==
=== 20th century ===
The Livingston Medium printed its first issue on September 1, 1970, as the campus newspaper of Livingston College.

During the 1980s, The Medium was heavily influenced by fanzine publisher Bill-Dale Marcinko. In the late 1970s, Marcinko became known in the alternative press through his fanzine AFTA (Ascension From The Ashes). As Clifford Meth later wrote, "AFTA may have been the first comics 'zine distributed to book and comic shops that combined comedy, politics and reviews on books, films, and comics. It was very much an underground version of Crawdaddy, though with vastly personal content. Its formula would be duplicated over and over, but AFTA was an original." Marcinko brought the same concept to The Medium when he became its faculty advisor and arts editor. The paper parted from its roots as a traditional college newspaper and became, like AFTA, an outlet for various political persuasions, non-mainstream arts reviews, news, and Marcinko's personal writings. Through Marcinko, it also became an outlet for the emerging LGBT community at Rutgers, publishing coming-out stories, gay politics, poetry, scene reports from the leather underground, and gay porn, much of it written by Marcinko himself.

Under Marcinko's influence, The Medium also became the focus of intense controversy, the subject of protests from students and parents, and attempts by the student government to defund the newspaper. The paper was criticized continuously from all areas of the political and social spectrum, but continued publishing content outside the mainstream, often employing shock value to test the limits of free speech. For example, the newspaper published front-page photos of a dismembered corpse for a 1985 review of the book, Hollywood Babylon II, a glowing tribute to gay love in a piece titled "Romancing the Anus", as well as a parody of the media coverage surrounding the Space Shuttle Challenger disaster in 1986, in a piece subtitled "People explode every day". However, The Medium was not at that time a humor publication as it is today. Rather, humor was used self-consciously in an attempt at cultural subversion.

Around the same time, The Medium began publishing anonymous, uncensored content from the university community in the Personals section, so anyone with access to pen and paper could see their words in print at the back of the paper. Eventually, the Personals became the most read section of the paper. As Bill-Dale Marcinko was an instructor at Rutgers and not a tenured professor, he was eventually terminated by the university, and had less impact on the newspaper after his departure. At the request of advisors, The Medium no longer prints pornographic material.

The Medium has been sued many times over their publication of offensive material. In 1991, an editor altered a personal placed in the year's final edition. The original personal ("If you've been assigned to Room 104 in Lippincott next semester, please contact me at XXX") was modified (to "If you've been assigned to Room 104 in Lippincott next semester, we need to speak - I am HIV positive and perpetually flatulent. Please contact me at XXX"). The resulting suit, Edwards v. Rutgers, was dismissed after the paper agreed to run a front-page apology.

=== 21st century ===
In 2004, The Medium published an anti-semitic cartoon on Holocaust Remembrance Day depicting Jews being thrown in an oven as a carnival game, with the caption: "Knock a Jew in the oven! Three throws for one dollar!" Rutgers University President Richard McCormick called the cartoon "deplorable" and "outrageous in its cruelty", and later met with the editorial board and urged them to take accountability. In 2012, the paper again came under fire for running a similar article titled "What about the good things Hitler did?" and listing another Rutgers student, a Zionist activist unaffiliated with The Medium, as the author. McCormick criticized the article, calling it "extremely offensive".

In 2013, The Medium published an article comparing members of the Alpha Chi Omega sorority to livestock and other fat barn animals, sparking outrage from the student body and members of Alpha Chi Omega, which was shutting down due to a lack of new pledges. The day after the article was published, over 200 people attended a rally in front of a dining hall on campus to show their support for Greek life and to protest The Medium's decision to run the article. Some students were especially upset because the article was published during Eating Disorder Awareness Week. The Medium issued a public apology the following week, writing that the article "was cruel and relied on cheap jokes in lieu of humor".

== Sections ==
The Medium traditionally contained eight pages and was divided into six section: news, features, art, op-ed, personals and the back page. Starting from spring semester of 2014, The Medium abandoned the old format by replacing the back page section with the new sports section while shortening the personals to just one page due to the similar purpose between the back page and the features sections. Moreover, The Medium has abandoned the famous Mr. Monkey logo by replacing it with "Fratypus", the newly adopted mascot. The Medium elected a new mascot for Spring 2018. Starting that semester, the new mascot is a cucumber with a condom rolled three-quarters of the way down, otherwise named "Carlos the Cucumber".

The Back Page was replaced at the start of Spring 2014. It originated as a replacement of the What's Shakin' page which, starting in the 1980s, listed on-campus events such as underground concerts, comedy shows, and other events submitted by readers, which had decreased over time. The new page was initially named Wine & Lifestyle, but was later changed to The Back Page. It is distinguished from the features section by diversions such as puzzles and games. It also regularly contains fake reviews of eateries (including the Rutgers dining halls), movies, and campus events. As a homage to the earlier What's Shakin' page, the "Mini What's Shakin'" section is mainly intended to promote the meetings of The Medium, but also pokes fun at other odd events occurring on campus.

- News - The first two pages of The Medium are the news sections. They satirize news of Rutgers University campus, current events, and popular culture.
- Features - The features section normally includes recurring content. Examples include a piece by the editor giving a humorous opinion or point of view on events on campus, a Student of the Week piece featuring students around campus, and the Cute Thing of the Week which shows images of cute things submitted by students.
- Opinions - The opinions section contains in-character and real-student submitted opinions commenting on current events and occurrences at the university and/or real life. An example feature of this page is the Point/Counterpoint, which presents opposing views of the same issue side by side.
- Arts - The arts section includes staff and student-submitted comics and art pieces. Readers also submit images of graffiti found around the campus. Occasionally, a writer or editor may also review music or movies here.
- Personals - In the personals section, anonymous messages are printed in the newspaper in the style of classified ads, allowing students to freely criticize, compliment, or otherwise address Rutgers administration, other students and national establishments. In Spring 2014, as part of a reorganization, the personals section shrank from two pages to one, and now has one editor.
- A7 - Page A7 is a modern iteration of the back page, crossed with features. Starting Spring 2014, it took over the seventh page of the newspaper, replacing the second page of personals. It includes creative think-pieces, reviews of pop culture artifacts, and other content that does not exactly fit any other page.
- Sports - The sports page debuted Spring 2014. Besides articles and news in pictures, the page includes Keys to the Matchup and Top Tens. The newspaper previously had a sports section during the 1980s.

== Other media ==
The paper is produced weekly throughout the academic year, and distributed on the Rutgers campuses. In addition, the organization publishes articles and other content online. In addition to the regular paper, throughout the year there are special issues and features:

- Meet The Medium: Published early in each semester, this special feature introduces the editorial staff and staff writers.
- Themed Issue: There is usually one theme issue in a given semester in which all of the articles and artwork corresponds to a particular theme. For example, a kindergarten issue where the content was written as if produced by children.
- Finale: The final issue of the semester is typically similar to a theme issue, but is usually longer (12 pages as opposed to 4). The end of fall semester usually has a special holiday section, and the end of spring usually features obituaries for graduating staff and some type of summer feature.
- The Daily Medium: On the week of April Fool's Day, the staff of the paper distribute a parody of The Daily Targum called The Daily Medium. It is typically designed to visually look like The Daily Targum, and features articles written to mimic the writing style and tone of well known Targum writers.
- Obituaries: At the end of the year, obituaries are written for graduating staff.

== Notable alumni ==
- Christopher McCulloch, creator of The Venture Bros.
