= List of satirical magazines =

This is a list of satirical magazines which have a satirical bent, and which may consist of fake news stories for mainly humorous purposes. For magazines published online, see List of satirical news websites.

== Active ==
Name	Country	Place	Founded	Comments
Academia Cațavencu	Romania	Bucharest	1991	
Annals of Improbable Research	United States	Cambridge, Massachusetts	1994	Styled as an academic journal; see also Ig Nobel Prize
Äpy	Finland	Espoo	1948	Journal published every other year by Aalto University students (see also Julkku). Published every other year
Blandaren	Sweden	Stockholm	1863	Founded by students at KTH Royal Institute of Technology
Caras y Caretas	Argentina	Buenos Aires	1898	
Le Canard enchaîné	France	Paris	1915	
Le Canard libéré	Morocco	Casablanca	2007	
Charlie Hebdo	France	Paris	1969	publication suspended in 1981–1992; publication continued despite mass killing of contributors at its offices in 2015
The Chaser	Australia		1999	Originally fortnightly; publication ceased in 2005-2015 and later returned to quarterly issues
The Clinic	Chile	Santiago	1998	
Ad-Dabbour	Lebanon	Beirut	1922	Ceased print in 2019; continues online
La Distinction	Switzerland	Lausanne	1987	
Eulenspiegel	Germany/East Germany	Berlin	1954	the only satire magazine of East Germany
Frank	Canada	Ottawa; Halifax, Nova Scotia	1987	
La Furia	France	Paris	2022	
Golden Words	Canada	Kingston, Ontario	1967	Engineering newspaper of Queen's University
Le Grognon	Democratic Republic of the Congo	Kinshasa	1991	
Grönköpings Veckoblad	Sweden	Stockholm	1902	
The Harvard Lampoon	United States	Cambridge	1876	Student publication of Harvard University
Hócipő	Hungary	Budapest	1989	
Hosteni	Albania	Tirana	1945	published monthly until 1991, quarterly onward
Humo	Belgium	Antwerp	1936	Dutch-language; also a TV and music magazine
Humor Times	United States	Sacramento	1991	Monthly, available in print and digital formats
El Jueves	Spain	Barcelona	1977	
LeMan	Turkey	Istanbul	1990	
The Lemon Press	United Kingdom	York	2009	Student publication
Mad	United States	New York	1952	Ceased print publication in 2018
The Medium	United States	New Brunswick, New Jersey	1970	Student publication of Rutgers University
Mongolia	Spain	Madrid	2012	
The Mugdown	United States	College Station	2012	Student publication of Texas A&M University
Mushtum	Uzbekistan	Tashkent	1923	
Nebelspalter	Switzerland	Zürich; Rorschach (from 1921); Basel (from 1996); Horn (from 1998)	1875	Proscribed in Nazi Germany
Nie	Poland	Warsaw	1990	
Noseweek	South Africa		1993	
The Onion	United States	Chicago	1988	Stopped print in 2013, but resumed in 2024
The Oxymoron	United Kingdom	Oxford	2007	Publication by students at the University of Oxford; printed three times a year and published online
't Pallieterke	Belgium	Grimbergen	1945	Dutch-language
Pan	Belgium	Brussels	1945	French-language. In 2010, Pan merged with another satirical publication, Père Ubu (founded 1990), into Ubu-Pan; that merger fell apart in 2017 because of editorial disagreements regarding ideology
Pennsylvania Punch Bowl	United States	Philadelphia	1899	Student publication of University of Pennsylvania
Perets'	Ukraine	Kharkiv (initially), Kyiv	1927	Ceased print publication since 2021
The Phoenix	Ireland	Dublin	1983	
To Pontiki	Greece	Athens	1979	
Private Eye	United Kingdom	London	1961	
Sorry	Czech Republic	Prague	1992	
Starshel	Bulgaria	Sofia	1886	Uninterrupted publication since 1946
Svikmøllen	Denmark		1915	
Titanic	Germany	Frankfurt	1979	
Unmad	Bangladesh	Dhaka	1978	Published quarterly until 1991, monthly onward
Il Vernacoliere	Italy	Livorno	1982	
Vigousse	Switzerland	Lausanne	2009	
The Yale Record	United States	New Haven, Connecticut	1872	Student publication of Yale University

== Defunct ==
Name	Country	Place	Founded	Defunct	Comments
L'Asino	Italy	Rome	1892	1925	
L'Assiette au Beurre	France	Paris	1901	1936	
La Avispa	Spain	Madrid	1883	1891	
Il Becco Giallo	Italy	Rome	1924	1931	
El Be Negre	Spain	Barcelona	1931	1936	Briefly revived in 1979 as Amb potes rosses
Bertoldo	Italy	Milan	1936	1943	
Buen Humor	Spain	Madrid	1921	1931	
La Campana de Gràcia	Spain	Barcelona	1870	1934	Suspended in 1872, 1874 and 1890, and substituted by L'Esquella de la Torratxa
Candido	Italy	Milan	1945	1961	
Cane Toad Times	Australia	Brisbane	1977	1990	Motivated by political events in Queensland under the Bjelke-Petersen Government (1968–1987).
La Caricature	France	Paris	1830	1843	
La Caricature	France	Paris	1880	1904	
Cascabel	Argentina	Buenos Aires	1941	1947	
Le Charivari	France	Paris	1832	1937	
Cu-Cut!	Spain	Barcelona	1902	1912	briefly revived 1913–14
Cuore	Italy	Rome	1989	1996	
Cyrulik Warszawski	Poland	Warsaw	1926	1934	associated with the Skamander literary circle; the title Cyrulik Warszawski translates as "The Barber of Warsaw".
Davul	Ottoman Empire	Istanbul	1908	1909	
Dikobraz	Czechoslovakia; Czech Republic (from 1993)		1945	1995	from 1990 under the title Nový Dikobraz; briefly revived 2004–2005 under the title Dikobraz a Zabaveno; the title Dikobraz translates as "Old World Porcupine"
Der Drache	Germany	Leipzig	1919	1925	
Don Quijote	Argentina	Buenos Aires	1884	1905	
Don Quijote	Spain	Madrid	1892	1903	
Emme	Italy	Rome	2007	2009	
L'Esquella de la Torratxa	Spain	Barcelona	1890	1939	spin-off of La Campana de Gràcia
Feral Tribune	Croatia	Split	1984	2008	published from 1984 until 1993 as a weekly supplement in Nedjeljna Dalmacija, published from 1993 until 2008 as an independent weekly magazine
La Flaca	Spain	Barcelona	1869	1873	Continued as La Madeja Política until 1876
Fliegende Blätter	Germany	Munich	1845	1944	
Frank	Canada	Halifax	1987	2008	
Frigidaire	Italy	Giano dell'Umbria	1980	2008	
Fun	United Kingdom	London	1861	1901	
Gedeón	Spain	Madrid	1895	1912	
Gil Blas	Spain	Madrid	1864	1872	
Gırgır	Turkey	Istanbul	1972	1989	
Gracia y Justicia	Spain	Madrid	1931	1936	
Le Grelot	France	Paris	1871	1903	
La Grosse Bertha	France		1991	1993	
Der Groyser Kundes	United States	New York	1909	1927	
Guerin Meschino	Italy	Milan	1882	1950	
Hackberg Post	Germany	Passau	2016	2023	German-English online-publication from 2016 until 2017, from 2018 onwards only German edition in printed form
Hamburger Wespen	Germany	Hamburg	1862	1868	
Hara-Kiri	France	Paris	1961	1985	reappeared briefly in 1993 and 2000. Additional weekly magazine published in 1969–1970.
Hum	Argentina	Buenos Aires	1978	1999	
Journal of Irreproducible Results	various		1955	2019	Scientific focus
Journal of Polymorphous Perversity	United States	New York	1984	2003	Scientific focus
Karuzela	Poland	Łódź	1957	1992	
Kikeriki	Austria	Vienna	1861	1933	
Kladderadatsch	Germany	Berlin	1848	1944	
Krokodil	Soviet Union; Russian Federation (from 1991)	Moscow	1922	2004	from 2001 under the title Novyi Krokodil («Новый Крокодил»); the only satirical magazine in the world to be honoured with a musical composition: "5 Romances to the Words from the Crocodile Magazine" («5 романсов на слова из журнала „Крокодил“») by Dmitri Shostakovich (1965).
Il Lampione	Grand Duchy of Tuscany/Italy	Florence	1848	1877	
La Lanterne	France/Belgium	Paris, Brussels	1868	1876	Paris edition was stopped in 1869 for violation of lèse-majesté laws of the Second Empire, second edition, in exile in Brussels, started 1874
La Lente	Grand Duchy of Tuscany	Florence	1856	1861	
Leuchtkugeln	Germany	Munich	1848	1851	
Madrid Cómico	Spain	Madrid	1880	1923	
Il Male	Italy	Rome	1978	1982	
Il Misfatto	Italy	Rome	2010	2013	
El Mole	Spain	Valencia	1837	1870	Irregular publication with four major breaks
El Motín	Spain	Madrid	1881	1926	
Moskovskaya Komsomolka	Russia	Moscow	1999	2001	
Mucha	Poland	Warsaw	1868	1952	
Münchener Punsch	Germany	Munich	1848	1871	
'U Panarijdde	Italy	Taranto	1902	1953	
Papitu	Spain	Barcelona	1908	1937	
Par Condicio	Italy		2004	2005	
Il Pasquino	Kingdom of Sardinia/Italy	Turin	1856	1930	
El Papus	Spain	Barcelona	1973	1987r	
Penguen	Turkey	Istanbul	2002	2017	
Przegięcie Pały	Poland		1988	1989	founded by Krzysztof Skiba associated with the Ruch Społeczeństwa Alternatywnego & Orange Alternative movements
Punch	United Kingdom	London	1841	2002	
The Realist	United States	New York City	1958	2001	
Le Rire	France	Paris	1894	1971	Also published a bimonthly Fantasio (1906-1937)
Różowe Domino	Poland (under Austrian partition)	Lwów (now Lviv)	1882	1890	whole print runs frequently confiscated by the censorship of Austria-Hungary; the title translates as "Pink Domino".
Simplicissimus	Germany	Munich	1896	1944	
Siné Mensuel	France	Paris	2011	2025	succeeded the weekly magazine Siné Hebdo published from 2008 to 2010
Spy	United States		1986	1998	
Lo Stenterello	Grand Duchy of Tuscany	Florence	1848	1849	
Süddeutscher Postillon	Germany	Munich	1882	1910	
Szpilki	Poland	Warsaw (Łódź 1945–1947)	1935	1994	founded by Eryk Lipiński & Zbigniew Mitzner; publication suspended during the Second World War between September 1939 and March 1945, and again for a few months during the dictatorship of General Jaruzelski
Tango	Italy	Rome	1986	1988	
Teacher's Diary	United Kingdom	London	2004	2004	a brief Private Eye spin-off
Tawfiq	Iran	Teheran	1922	1971	
La Traca	Spain	Valencia	1884	1939	Got several interrumptions, revived between 1995 and 2010.
Ulenspiegel	Germany	Berlin	1945	1950	
Ulk	Germany	Hamburg	1872	1933	
Uykusuz	Turkey	Istanbul	2007	2023	
La voce della fogna	Italy		1974	1983	
Der Wahre Jacob	Germany	Stuttgart	1879	1933	
Watzmann	Austria		1982	1985	
Weekly World News	United States		1979	2007	
Wiadomości Brukowe	Poland (under Russian partition)	Wilno (now Vilnius)	1816	1822	closed by the censorship of the Russian Empire; continued surreptitiously as Bałamut until 1836; the oldest satirical magazine in the world; the title Wiadomości Brukowe translates as "Gutter-rag News".
Svari	Latvia	Riga (Saint Petersburg 1906–1907)	1906	1931	Main satirical periodical in interwar Latvia, publication was suspended from 1907 to 1920.
Dadzis	Latvia	Riga	1957	2009	Publication was suspended from 1995 to 2005.
100Most	Hong Kong	Hong Kong	2013	2018	

== See also ==
Media related to Magazines about satire at Wikimedia Commons

- List of satirists and satires
- List of satirical news websites
- List of satirical television news programs
