= List of magazines in Latvia =

Uchilische Blagochestija was an Orthodox magazine that was started in Latvia in 1850. The first Latvian literary magazine was Pagalms which was published from 1880/81 to 1884. One of the early mass circulation magazines in Latvia was an illustrated weekly entitled Atpūta which existed between 1924 and 1940. After the end of the Communist rule in the country in 1991 the first magazines dominated the market were entertainment, celebrity and consumer titles. In addition, the first music magazines were started during this period.

Magazines in Latvia increased between 2001 and 2007. The European Journalism Observatory reported in 2017 that magazines in Latvia were more read than national and daily newspapers. There are various magazines covering history, science and lifestyle. The number of magazine decreased in 2015. There were 322 magazines in the country in 2015, and their total circulation was 29.3 million copies per year. Some of the magazines in the country are printed in Russian and in English. International magazine titles such as FHM and National Geographic were published in Latvia until 2016.

The following is an incomplete list of current and defunct magazines published in Latvia.

== A ==
- Atpūta

== D ==
- Dadzis
- Domas
- Domuzīme

== I ==
- Ilustrētā Zinātne
- Ilustrēts Žurnāls
- Ir
- Ir Nauda

== K ==
- Karogs
- Kreisā Fronte

== P ==
- Padomju Latvijas Komunists

== R ==
- Rīgas Laiks

== S ==
- Santa
- Sējējs
- Signāls
- Svari

== V ==
- Vakara Ziņas
- VIP LOUNGE Luxury Lifestyle Society

== Z ==
- Zeltene
