= El Motín (Spain) =

Spanish satirical weekly newspaper (1881-1926)

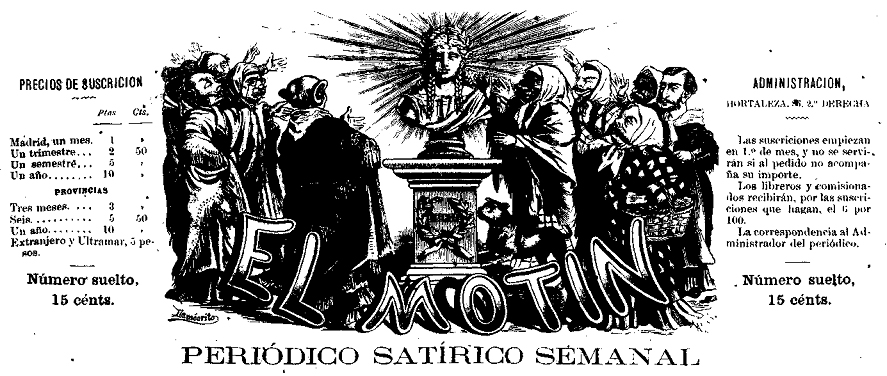
- Header of the first issue of the weekly
- Type: Weekly satirical newspaper
- Format: Satirical
- Founder(s): José Nakens, Juan Vallejo
- Founded: April 10, 1881; 145 years ago
- Ceased publication: November 6, 1926
- Political alignment: Republican, Anticlerical
- Language: Spanish
- Headquarters: Madrid, Spain
- ISSN: 1889-8904 (print); 2793-7852 (web)
- Website: http://hemerotecadigital.bne.es/issn/1889-8904

El Motín was a Spanish publication from the late 19th and early 20th centuries, notable for its long lifespan for the era: from its founding on April 10, 1881, until November 6, 1926. It was a satirical, republican, and anticlerical weekly newspaper, initially consisting of four pages that included a commentary on current events, a poem, brief news items, and an engraving on the center pages. Its objectives included criticizing conservatives, defending the unity of the republican party, and opposing the influence of the clergy. Its founder and driving force was José Nakens, whose life was closely intertwined with the newspaper's history. Additionally, the drawings and caricatures by "Demócrito" (the pseudonym of Eduardo Sojo were a highlight of El Motín.

== Publication history ==
=== Beginnings ===
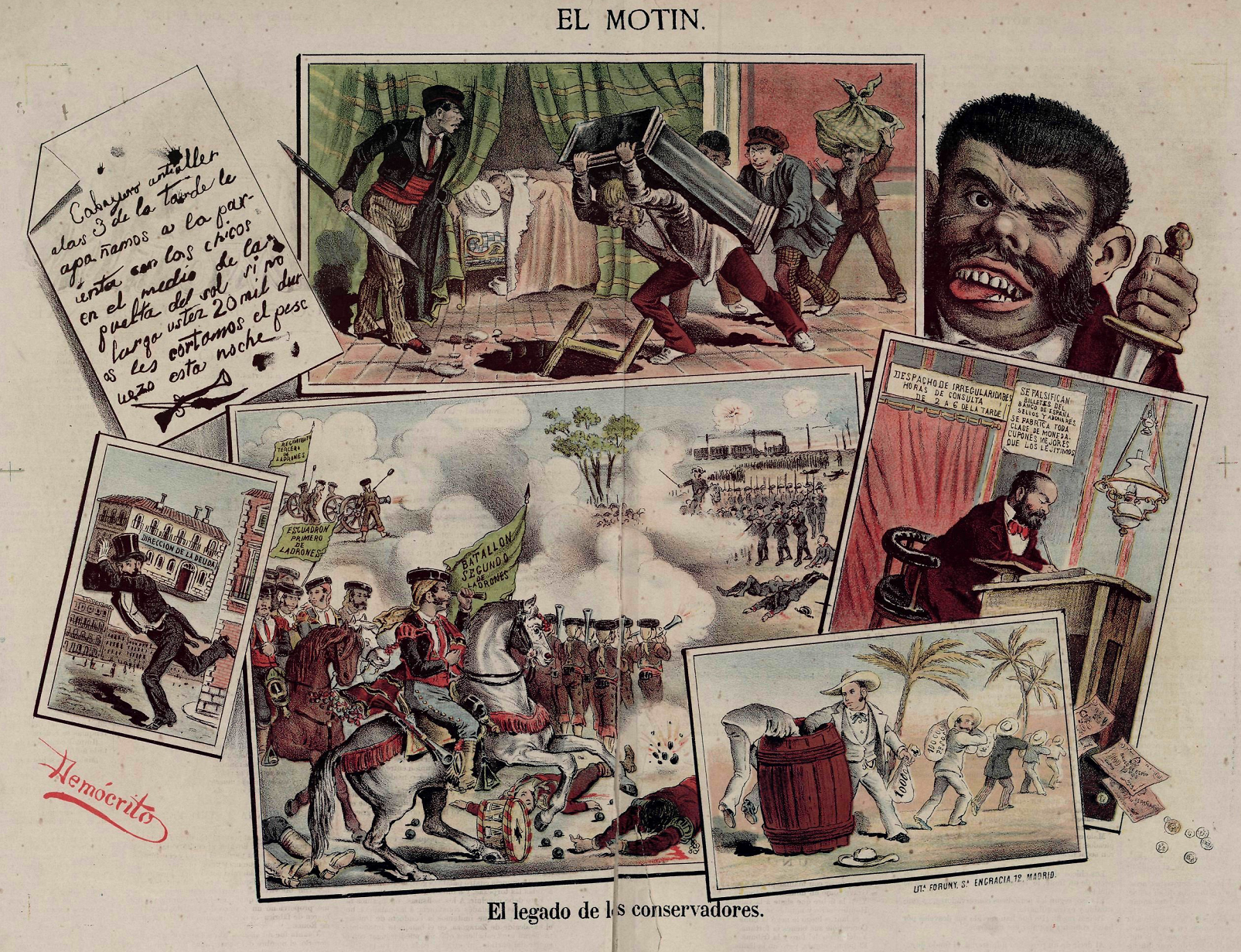
El legado de los conservadores, by "Demócrito", in the first issue of the weekly, April 10, 1881.

On Sunday, April 10, 1881, the first issue of El Motín was published, founded by José Nakens and Juan Vallejo. The introductory text stated:

Oh esteemed conservatives, may you exclaim upon reading the title of this newspaper! Oh, steadfast pillars of order, property, and family! Oh, wise politicians, with civic virtues and patriotic sacrifices, protectors of religion and defenders of morality! Oh, in short, the good, the loyal, the foresighted!...

Yes; there is a riot, and a weekly riot, directed primarily against you, to counteract the effects of the riot you stir up against liberty every day, every hour, every second. To arms, then, and fire upon us, conservatives of all shades, with the hollow words you keep in the arsenal of fear; speak to us of terror, the guillotine, undermined social foundations, trampled sacred principles, the Commune, nihilism, not forgetting the incendiary torch, the appetites of the masses, and bloody hecatombs; for we, the promoters of El Motín, will laugh heartily at you with the same persistence with which you mock the country you have exploited and scorned.

War on conservatives! It seems to us that this cry amounts to a program.

— "Dos palabras", El Motín, April 10, 1881. (partially quoted in)

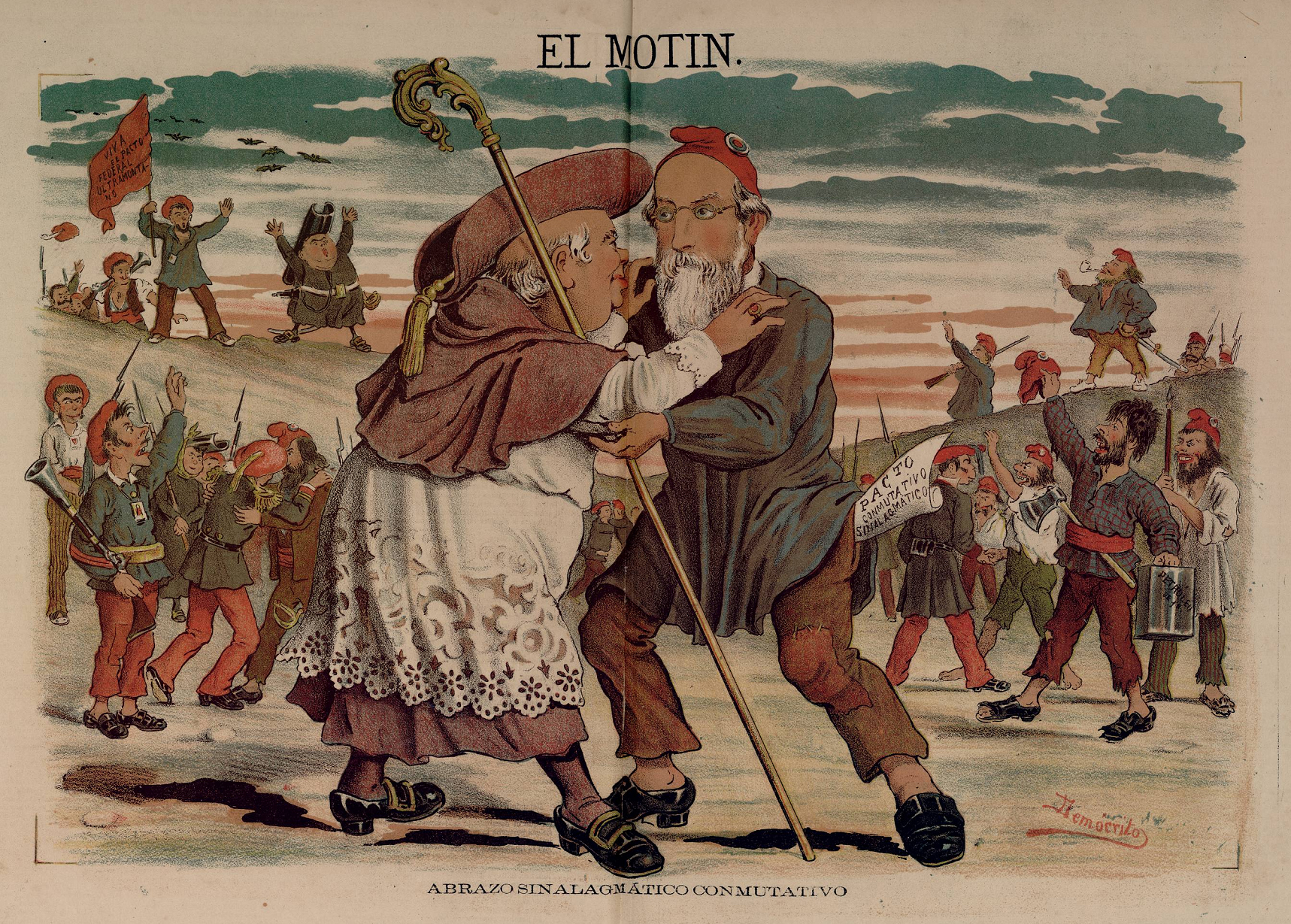
Abrazo sinalagmático conmutativo (Pi y Margall embracing a member of the clergy), by Demócrito, June 12, 1881.

El Motín began publication amid greater press freedom brought by the new liberal government led by Práxedes Mateo Sagasta, following six years of conservative rule under Antonio Cánovas del Castillo. El Motín "was a modest publication of four pages, divided between a commentary on current events, a poem, brief news items, and an engraving—initially a caricature of political figures and events—on the center pages." Its goals were to defend the unity of republicans in a single party and to combat conservatism and clericalism, with the section "Manojo de flores místicas" (Bunch of mystical flowers) justified as follows: "Jesus Christ drove the merchants from the temple with a whip; we, humble sinners, will try to emulate him, lashing weekly those who forget his law." This section, whose stories were compiled into books—the first titled Espejo moral de clérigos. Para que los malos se espanten y los buenos perseveren (Moral mirror of clerics. So that wicked are frightened and the good persevere)—made the weekly famous.

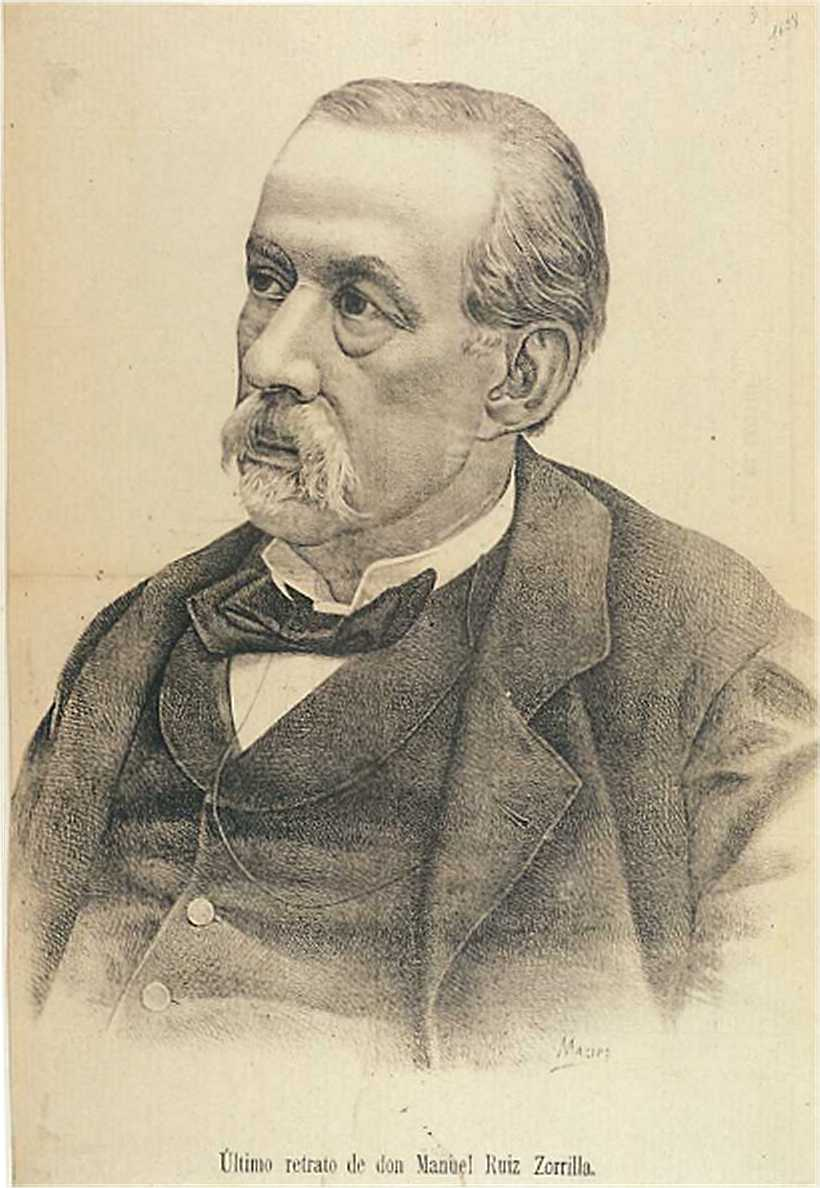
Last portrait of Manuel Ruiz Zorrilla, published in the republican and anticlerical weekly El Motín in 1895.

Although El Motín is considered the quintessential anticlerical newspaper, particularly for its coarse popular anticlericalism, it was primarily a political weekly dedicated to criticizing conservatives and liberals who alternated in the government of the Restoration and defending republican unity, supporting the insurrectional path advocated from Parisian exile by Manuel Ruiz Zorrilla. This led to harsh criticism of other republican leaders: Emilio Castelar, (Note: His manliness and virility were questioned, and he was even labeled a prostitute after delivering a sermon in a church.) Francesc Pi i Margall, (Note: Pi y Margall's federalist republicanism was criticized in favor of the more centralist vision of Zorrilla or Salmerón. Criticism of the Catalan politician softened after Nakens visited Ruiz Zorrilla in France, who asked him to moderate attacks on other republicans.) and Nicolás Salmerón.

By the mid-1890s, the newspaper faced severe financial difficulties due to hefty fines for press offenses and declining sales, partly because some republicans believed its virulent anticlericalism—similar to that of Las Dominicales del Libre Pensamiento—harmed the republican cause, criticizing its "tasteless mockery" and focus on illicit affairs between "lustful clerics and plump housekeepers." Despite Nakens lowering the price, problems persisted, and by the early 20th century, it was barely read. Nakens blamed the "misunderstanding" of republicans who failed to grasp that his goal was to "strip the clergy of authority so it could not use it to benefit Don Carlos." He told Luis Bonafoux around that time, "What do I care if priests have housekeepers, and they have children, or if they break the commandment following the fifth with willing parishioners!"

After the deaths of Ruiz Zorrilla in 1895, Castelar in 1899, and Pi y Margall in 1902, El Motín supported Nicolás Salmerón, the last surviving historical leader of Spanish republicanism, but distanced itself from him in 1905 as he moved away from radical revolutionary action. Additionally, Nakens was "completely discredited" politically after his involvement in the 1906 assassination attempt on Alfonso XIII, discussed below.

=== Fines and legal proceedings ===
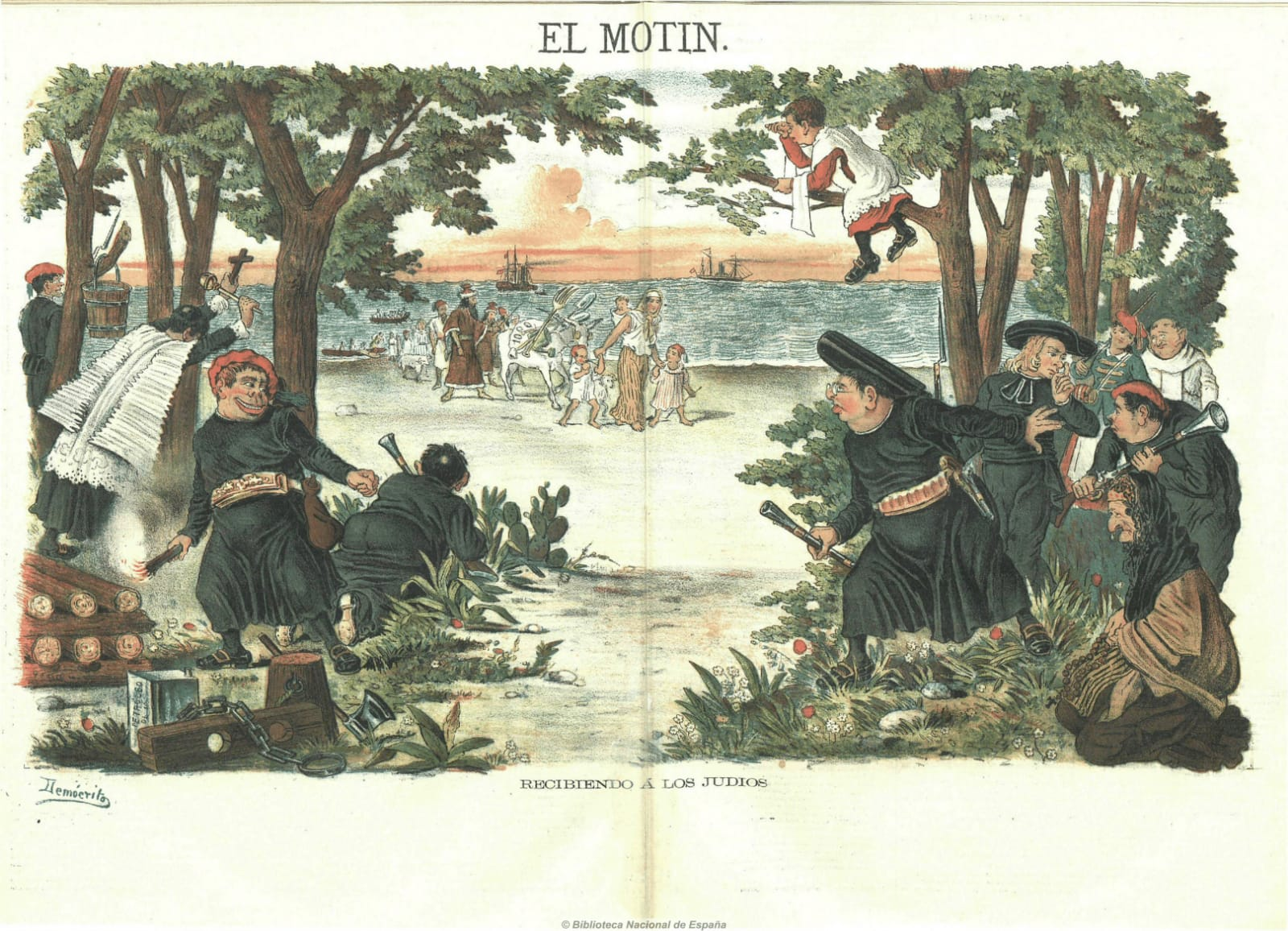
Recibiendo a los judíos, Year I (1881), No. 15, p. 2

Throughout its history, El Motín faced numerous legal proceedings for alleged press offenses, resulting in fines, imprisonment of several legal directors—including co-founder Juan Vallejo—and distributors, especially under conservative governments. For example, from January 1884 to November 1885, it endured 84 press offense cases and fourteen 500-peseta fines. Moreover, various bishops issued at least 47 excommunications against its editors, who in turn "excommunicated" the bishops in the name of Fray Motín, bishop of the religion of Labor in the diocese of Common Sense. They also used various tactics to avoid police seizure of copies. In the mid-1880s, the weekly repeatedly criticized the Carlist newspaper El Siglo Futuro. The newspaper miraculously survived despite low subscriptions and distribution difficulties, as it could hardly be sold on the streets.

In 1898, the conservative government, leveraging the suspension of constitutional guarantees during the Spanish–American War, heavily censored El Motín, despite its support for the war and fervent patriotism. An article about the reign of Ferdinand VII was suppressed for calling Ferdinand "miserable," his mother "frivolous," and his brother Carlos María Isidro "wicked and immoral." Nakens responded by suspending publication until constitutional guarantees were restored in 1899.

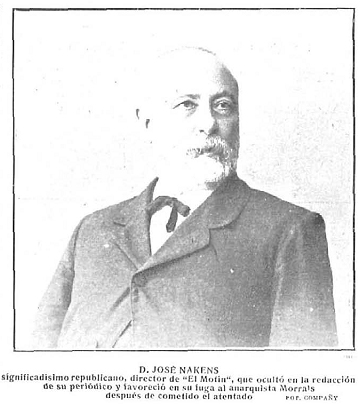
Portrait of José Nakens, founder of the weekly, published in 1906 in Nuevo Mundo following the "concealment" incident involving Mateo Morral.

El Motín ceased publication between 1906 and 1908 because Nakens was sentenced to ten years in prison for "concealing" the terrorist Mateo Morral, who threw a bomb at King Alfonso XIII and his wife on May 31, 1906, on Calle Mayor in Madrid, and committed suicide the next day. Nakens was released early due to the prestige and popularity gained from articles in the republican newspaper El Pais, where he denounced the inhumane conditions of prisoners and supported reforms by the new director of the Cárcel Modelo, forcing the government of Antonio Maura to pardon him.

=== Peak and decline ===
Despite being 67 years old upon release, Nakens resumed publishing El Motín. Thanks to the prestige gained during his imprisonment—those who once called him a "reverse inquisitor" and "decrepit old man" now considered him a "great man," as Ramiro de Maeztu described him—the newspaper gained many readers in this second period, reaching circulations of over 20,000 copies and expanding to sixteen pages by 1910. The newspaper's appearance improved, and other publications promoted by Nakens, such as pamphlets from the Biblioteca del Apostolado de la Verdad and Hojitas piadosas, reached circulations of nearly 100,000 copies. He also published a dozen books compiling his thousands of articles.

Without abandoning its republicanism, during this second phase, El Motín intensified its anticlericalism at a time when the religious question was prominent in Spanish politics due to the Tragic Week and the Lock Law proposed by the liberal government of José Canalejas. This led to further legal troubles, particularly due to two caricatures. The first depicted Christ on the cross while a bishop, a Jesuit, and a friar gorged on chickens bought with mass and requiem stipends, captioned "The one who brought the chickens and those who eat them." The second, titled "Holy Family!", showed a priest holding a bottle a woman was about to give to a baby. A Jesuit denounced it, and Nakens was convicted for offending Catholic morality, a surprising first in the newspaper's 31-year history. In 1914, he was denounced and convicted again for slandering a cleric. He responded with an Almanaque de la Inquisición, detailing autos-da-fé and torture plates used by the Spanish Inquisition, described as "that monstrous tribunal created, supported, and defended by the Catholic Church, to amass wealth, satisfy vendettas, and impose itself on peoples through terror." He also published an Almanaque cómico del carlismo para los años 1914 a 1999, which prompted Carlists to place a firecracker in the hallway of El Motín’s administration.

However, El Motín began losing readers (about 6,000 between 1911 and 1914). In 1915, it reduced to eight pages and to four by 1918. That year, Nakens, then 77, suffered from vision problems, preventing him from writing at times when he was the sole editor. Although Nakens attributed the decline to his fight against "the fetishes the people worship," historian Manuel Pérez Ledesma argues it was mainly due to the weekly’s "monotony—largely devoted to reprinting old articles and copying texts from other newspapers—and its lack of attention to current events." By 1920, circulation had dropped to about 6,000 copies. At a loyal reader’s initiative, a subscription was organized to publish a special tribute issue to Nakens, released in January 1923, with contributions from prominent republicans like Emilio Menéndez Pallarés, Roberto Castrovido, and Hermenegildo Giner de los Ríos, and younger ones like Marcelino Domingo, Álvaro de Albornoz, and Gabriel Alomar. The issue featured a Sonata en on by Luis de Tapia, which read:

I admire Nakens / for his tenacity...

Because his heart / is an anvil...
[...] Because, having fulfilled / his duty,

He will go to the grave / without confession...

In late 1924, journalists and intellectuals like Gregorio Marañón, Rafael Altamira, Ramón Pérez de Ayala, and Luis Araquistáin mobilized to raise funds for Nakens, burdened by debts. In mid-1925, the Madrid Press Association, chaired by José Francos Rodríguez, granted him a lifetime pension of 150 pesetas per month, "in recognition of the merits earned in his long and honorable journalistic career," and later awarded him the Old Age Prize of 5,000 pesetas. On September 12, 1926, the octogenarian republican journalist died of a stroke. The final issue of El Motín was published shortly after, on November 6, 1926.

Three months after his death, Nakens’ daughter, Isabel, his main collaborator in later years, relaunched the publication as Reflejos de «El Motín», subtitled "literary weekly" to evade censorship under the Dictatorship of Primo de Rivera, though its purpose was clear: "today, as yesterday, this newspaper is and will always be pro-republican union and anticlerical of all religions." It promoted a secular charity fund to reward those who replaced Catholic baptism, marriage, or burial rites with civil ones. The newspaper closed in June 1929 due to financial issues, with its farewell consisting of sending subscribers an old issue of El Motín. Two years later, the Second Spanish Republic was created by the Proclamation of the Second Spanish Republic.

== Contributors ==
El Motín featured texts by José Nakens and Juan Vallejo. In its early years, it included illustrations—often in color—by Eduardo Sojo, who also designed the first header. Later, according to Nakens in an issue of El Motín, drawings were by Antonio Macipe, from 1884 to at least June 1915. Segismundo Pey Ordeix also contributed to the weekly.

== Bibliography ==
- Llera Ruiz, José Antonio (2003). "Una historia abreviada de la prensa satírica en España, desde "El Duende Crítico de Madrid" hasta "Gedeón"" (PDF). Estudios sobre el mensaje periodístico (in Spanish) (9): 203–214. ISSN 1134-1629. Archived from the original (PDF) on August 8, 2014.
- Pérez Ledesma, Manuel (2000). "José Nakens (1841–1926). Pasión anticlerical y activismo republicano". In Isabel Burdiel and Manuel Pérez Ledesma (ed.). Liberales, agitadores y conspiradores. Biografías heterodoxas del siglo XIX (in Spanish). Madrid: Espasa-Calpe. ISBN 84-239-6048-X.
- Sanabria, Enrique (2009). Republicanism and Anticlerical Nationalism in Spain (in Spanish). Palgrave Macmillan. ISBN 9780230620087.

== Additional bibliography ==
- Nakens, José (2010). Puntos negros y otros artículos. Introduction by Alfredo Grimaldos. Madrid: Linterna Sorda. ISBN 9788493656287.
