= Andris Kolbergs =

Latvian writer (1938–2021)

- Born: 21 December 1938; Jūrmala, Latvia
- Died: 5 November 2021 (aged 82); Riga, Latvia
- Occupation: Writer

Andris Kolbergs (21 December 1938 – 5 November 2021) was a Latvian writer.

He won the Annual Latvian Literature Award in 2011.

== Biography ==
Born on 21 December 1938, Andris was the son of ship captain Leonid Kolbergs. He studied at Moscow State University of Printing Arts from 1966 to 1968. He worked as a wagonmaker and electrical factory worker before becoming a correspondent for the humorous magazine Dadzis.

Kolbergs published his first novel in 1969, titled Arnolda Zandes cigarete. Several of his books have been adapted into movies by Riga Film Studio and notably directed by Aloizs Brenčs. In 1974, he became a member of the Latvijas Rakstnieku savienība.

Andris Kolbergs died of COVID-19 in Riga on 5 November 2021 at the age of 82.

== Decorations ==
- Officer of the Order of the Three Stars (2019)

== Works ==
- Arnolda Zandes cigarete (1969)
- Šāviens dienas laikā (1971)
- Pašu puikas (1974)
- Vanags (1974)
- Krimināllieta trijām dienām (1977)
- Cilvēks, kas skrēja pāri ielai (1978)
- Fotogrāfija ar sievieti un mežakuili (1983)
- Atraitne janvārī (1984)
- Ēna (1985)
- Naktī, lietū (1986)
- Automobilī, rīta pusē (1986)
- Nekas nav noticis (1988)
- Kolekcionāra mīlas dēkas (1988)
- Civilizēto krokodilu sindroms (1993)
- Dumpis uz laupītāju kuģa (1993)
- Meklējiet sievieti (1996)
- Pulkstenis ar atpakaļgaitu (2002)
- Klaunu maršs šausmu tirgū (2002)
- Sieviete melnā (2004)
- Patiesi stāsti par VIP un kolekcionēšanas dullumu (2005)
- Sarkans automobilis melnā naktī (2008)
