= Jānis Tilbergs =

Latvian artist (1880–1972)

Jānis Roberts Tillbergs
- Born: 2 July [O.S. 20 June] 1880; Riga, Governorate of Livonia, Russian Empire
- Died: 7 November 1972 (aged 92); Riga, Latvian SSR
- Known for: Painting, Sculpture
- Movement: Realism

Jānis Roberts Tillbergs (sometimes anglicised as Tilberg; 2 July [O.S. 20 June] 1880 – 7 November 1972) was a Latvian artist, painter, sculptor, and medallist. He is most renowned as a highly accomplished portraitist.

== Career ==
From 1901 to 1909 Tilbergs studied under Dmitry Kardovsky at the Imperial Academy of Arts in Saint Petersburg, then the capital of the Russian Empire.

Tilbergs graduated from the Riga City School of Art, studying under Dimitriyev Kaukazska, and then went on to complete his master's degree at the St. Petersburg Art Academy in 1909, studying there under D. Kardovska and submitting Pietà as his masterwork.

His artwork appeared in publication already in 1904 in the journal Austrums where he illustrated Andrievs Niedra's story Bads un Mīlestība (Hunger and Love), and he went on to illustrate a number of other books. He was the graphic designer for the satirical journal Svari, published in St. Petersburg and Riga; as well, he illustrated for the Russian journals Serij Volk and Novaja Rusj.

Tilbergs helped organize and exhibited at the first Latvian art exhibition of 1910. Over his career, he exhibited at various international venues (Denmark, Sweden, Norway, France, England, et al.) as an ambassador of Latvian art and in one man shows in Riga (1934, 1960) and Tallinn (1961).

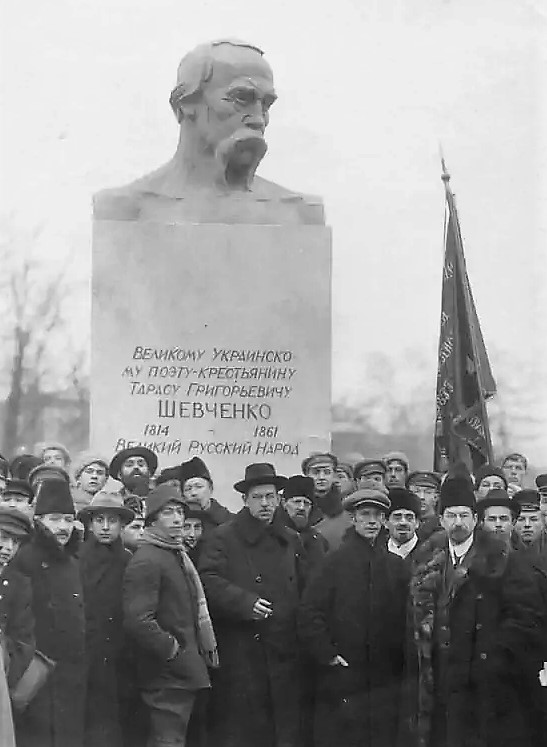
The 1918 monument by Tilbergs to Taras Shevchenko in Petrograd (Saint Petersburg) was the first monument dedicated to the Ukrainian poet

Following the 1917 Russian Revolution, Tilbergs took part in Lenin's "Monumental propaganda" program that called for the creation of the "Revolutionary monumental art", construction of the monuments to the revolutionaries and the "progressive artists of all times and nations". Tilbergs' plaster monument to Ukrainian poet and artist Taras Shevchenko was dedicated on 1 December 1918. This first ever Shevchenko monument was not later replaced by the bronze version, as was originally planned, and was dismantled in eight years as the plaster deteriorated in open air.

In 1918, Tilbergs briefly served as the director of the sculpture studio at the People's Art School in Vitebsk. Tilbergs became a professor in the Latvian Academy of Arts in Riga where he taught a Figural Painting Master class in 1921–1932. He authored several designs of the coins minted in the interwar Latvia. The Latvian lats coins struck in 1924–1926 carried the palm branch design by Tilbergs, a motive popular in Europe at the time. In academia, Tilbergs was considered a master of the salon portrait and his portraits of the Latvian poet Rainis (Jānis Pliekšāns) and Latvian theatrical producer Eduards Smiļģis are exhibited in the Latvian National Museum of Art. In Academy Tilbergs insisted on his students staying strictly within the academic canons of realism and was even considered despotic while his school was criticized for being too academic and lacking improvisation. In 1932, Tilbergs' class in Academia was taken over by Ģederts Eliass.

In 1936, he painted a new altar for the historic Sigulda church.

Tilbergs returned to the Academy in the post-World War II Soviet Latvia and remained a professor there from 1947 to 1957.

In January 2026, while searching for the lost works of Vilhelms Purvītis, Tilbergs' 1939 painting Latviešu meitene (Latvian Girl), which depicts a woman in a suiti folk costume and was taken out of Latvia in 1944, was discovered in the collections of the Schleswig-Holstein State Art and Cultural History Museum in Gottorf Castle in Schleswig.

== Recognition ==
Tilbergs was widely renowned in Latvian SSR, where he was accorded the title of the People's Artist of the Latvian SSR and decorated with the Soviet Order of the Red Banner of Labour.

In modern Latvia, he is recognised as one of the greatest national masters of the century. In 2005, the Latvian Post issued an item of postal stationery dedicated to Tilbergs' 125th birthday.

== Sources ==
- Тилберг Янис in the Great Soviet Encyclopedia (in Russian)
