= Ernests Elks-Elksnītis =

Latvian composer

- Born: 9 February 1878; Nēķens, Latvia
- Died: 16 October 1940 (aged 62); Cēsis, Latvia
- Occupation: Singer

Ernests Elks-Elksnītis (9 February 1878 – 16 October 1940) was a Latvian singer. His work was part of the music event in the art competition at the 1932 Summer Olympics. He was married to Emīlija Benjamiņa, one of the wealthiest women in Europe.
