= Emīlija Benjamiņa =

Latvian publisher

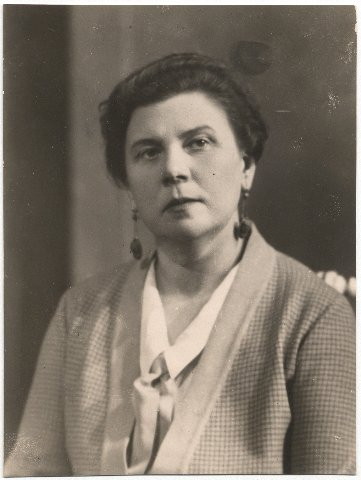
- Formal portrait was taken in a photo salon in the 1920s.
- Born: 10 September 1881; Riga, Latvia
- Died: 27 September 1941 (aged 60); Usollag labor camp, Soviet Union
- Occupation: Businesswoman

Emīlija Benjamiņa (sometimes transcribed Emilija Benjamina) (10 September 1881 – 27 September 1941) was a Latvian businesswoman. Acknowledged as the "Press Queen" in her home country, she became one of the wealthiest women in Europe at the time, and the richest person in interwar Latvia.

== Early life ==
Emīlija Simsone was the middle daughter of Andris Simsons, a railway employee, and Ede Usinš, who worked on the expedition line of a German newspaper, leading Emīlija to grow up in a press printing environment. Emīlija's two sisters were stage artists; the eldest, Mina (stage name Tusnelda) was an opera singer, while the youngest, Annija (Aicher) was an actress who made a name for herself in both the Latvian and German-language theater.

She started working at the age of 17 as an advertising agent and theater critic for the German-language newspaper, Rigaer Tagesblatt.

She married Ernests Elks-Elksnītis and became Emīlija Elks. But the marriage was not a happy one, Elks became an alcoholic and reportedly beat her.

== Publishing career ==
Sometime in 1904 or 1905, Emīlija met a man, married named Anton Benjamiņš. Twenty-one years older than Emilija, he was a bankrupt former school teacher and failed shop-owner who had come to Riga looking for work, which he found as the reporter on Latvian issues of the Rigaer Tagesblatt.

Over time, Emīlija Elks and Benjamin took over the practical running of the Rigaer Tagesblatt. Emīlija ran the business, while Benjamiņš was the editor. In 1909, Emīlija divorced Elks. For Benjamiņš however, that step would prove to be much more complicated and time-consuming as his existing spouse did not agree, and they also had three children.

In 1911 Emīlija and Benjamiņš decided to live together. On 8 December, Emīlija founded her own newspaper using funds she had obtained from her divorce settlement. She also persuaded all the Latvian-speaking journalists at the various German and Russian language newspapers in Riga to work for her, initially free of charge, to get a truly Latvian newspaper off the ground. Jaunākās Ziņas (The Latest News) was the first, mass distribution newspaper to be published in the Latvian language; Emīlija, as Emīlija Elks, was the publisher and Benjamiņš was her editor-in-chief. Emīlija's business sense and Anton's dedication to hard work soon bore fruit, and Jaunākās Ziņas blossomed. It employed many who would go on to be important names in the development of Latvian literature and culture and indeed of the written Latvian language itself, including the writer Kārlis Skalbe, the linguist Jānis Endzelīns.

At the outbreak of World War I Jaunākās Ziņas continued to publish as long as it could and made a name and market for itself by publishing the announcements of refugees searching for their family members, free of charge. But eventually, as four different sides (the Imperial German Army, the Bolsheviks, the pro-German local Landwehr, and finally the Army of the new Latvian Republic) marched through Riga, Jaunākās Ziņas shut down and during the Bolshevik occupation of Riga, Emīlija and Benjamiņš had to take refuge in Berlin for some six months.

Just before the war started Jaunākās Ziņas had received delivery of the latest industrial printing presses from Germany; now, since Germany was an enemy country of Imperial Russia, the bill no longer had to be paid and still later, when the war was over, the German firm in question was bankrupt and no longer existed. Later, the Bolsheviks "expropriated" the printing plant and used it to print their propaganda leaflets; when they were driven out, they abandoned tons of paper. This supplied the newly restarted Jaunākās Ziņas for free for over a year, a not insignificant commercial advantage at a moment in time when the paper was a very precious and expensive commodity in short supply.

== Benjamiņš Publishing ==
Anton Benjamiņš was finally able to get his divorce in 1922. And within a few months, Emīlija and Benjamiņš were finally legally married.

With peace, the Benjamiņšes set about building their publishing empire with vigor. In 1924, they started a new magazine Atpūta (Leisure) which quickly became the showpiece as well as a prime mover of the Latvian culture, which has developed after Czarist rule and Baltic-German cultural domination. In 1928 the Benjamiņšes bought the grandest private home in Riga, the so-called "Pfab Palace". Emīlija also owned a summer home on the beach in the town of Jūrmala (the beach resort of Latvia), and other buildings in Riga and bought a country estate called "Waldeck" near Kandava.

In 1927, the journal Aizkulises announced she was the richest woman in Latvia.

Emīlija looked to expand her business empire beyond publishing. To that end, in the latter part of the 1930s, she bought a ten-hectare industrial estate in Ķekava, by the Daugava river, with the intention of going into chemical manufacturing and color photograph development with her nephew and adopted son, Juris. Juris was by then a chemist and had already developed some new processes for color film printing.

Emīlija had no children from either her first or second marriage. So, to have an heir, in 1926 she had arranged with her younger sister, Annija, to adopt Annija's oldest son, Georg Aicher (who became "Juris Benjamiņš" after the adoption), as her own.

In 1938 Emīlija Benjamīņa decided to complement the finest city residence in the Baltics with the finest summer house on the beach and commissioned the German architect Lange to create what has become known as "The Emilija Benjamina House" in Jūrmala.

Anton Benjamiņš died on 14 June 1939, a month shy of his 79th birthday. At the time of his death, Anton and Emīlija jointly owned two businesses and twelve properties. It was said that their wealth at the time exceeded 60,000,000 Swiss gold francs. In his will, Anton arranged for Emīlija to have 51% (the controlling interest) of the businesses. Anton's children from his first marriage promptly challenged the will in Court and publicly declared that their father was insane. But history soon overtook the Court Case.

The Emilija Benjamina House was finished in the fall of 1939.

She was awarded Order of the Three Stars and the Swedish Order of Vasa’s gold medal.

== Soviet era and death ==
On 17 June 1940 the Red Army occupied Latvia and shortly thereafter the formerly independent country was incorporated into the Soviet Union. Everything that Emīlija owned was nationalized. Right at the beginning of the Soviet occupation, the Nazi government of Germany created a safe passage for people to escape, and Juris Benjamiņš used that to successfully evacuate the valuables from the Kr. Barona 12 house. Among them was one of the finest Sèvres porcelain collections in Europe and Tsar Nicholas II's gold cutlery collection that Emīlija had bought in Paris in the 1920s from Prince Felix Yusupov. The items were taken to Vienna but were stolen there and never recovered.

Jaunākās Ziņas was published for the last time on 9 August 1940. The newspaper had strongly advocated the advantages of parliamentary systems like those of the United Kingdom and Sweden.

Emīlija apparently thought she herself would be spared. The Swedish ambassador to Latvia offered to marry her, thereby making her a Swedish citizen with diplomatic protection. But he could not offer protection for her adopted son, so she refused his offer. Rudolph Aicher (her younger sister's husband) through his contacts with Joachim von Ribbentrop, managed to arrange an interview with Heinrich Himmler in the hopes of getting the German Government's intervention on her behalf. However, after having her and her newspaper's politics investigated, Himmler concluded that she was "Reichswidrig" ("an enemy of the Reich") and would not help. But above all, her former employee, her regular party guest, and her friend: Vilis Lācis, the new Communist Interior Minister for the Latvian Soviet Socialist Republic was the one who decided such things. And so, indeed he did.

Initially, Emīlija had been "moved" from her city residence at Kr. Barona Str. 12 to a small flat at Kr. Barona 19. On 14 June 1941 Soviet police came to the door with a list of names, told her to pack her things, and took her away. Juris was also on the list, but they could not find him.

Emīlija Benjamiņa was subject to the 1941 Soviet deportations from Latvia and died in the Usollag Gulag forced labor camp on 23 September 1941, a little over a week after her 60th birthday.

== Filmography ==
In 2021, the six-part film Emīlija. The Queen of the Latvian Press (Emīlija. Latvijas preses karaliene) premiered, starring Guna Zariņa as Benjamiņa.

== Sources ==
- Simsone, Annija Atminas, Atminas (Memories, Memories) Gramatu Draugs, (Toronto, Canada) 1961; Autobiography of Emilija's younger sister Annija. (in Latvian)
