= Jaunākās Ziņas =

Latvian newspaper

Jaunākās Ziņas (Latvian: The Latest News) was a newspaper published in Riga from 1911 to 1940 and was the largest and most influential paper of its era. The newspaper was owned by the Benjamiņi couple, initially begun with Emīlija Benjamiņa as publisher and Antons Benjamiņš as editor-in-chief. The editorial office of the paper also published a weekly magazine entitled Atpūta.

While at first an inexpensive newspaper for the general public, it became a leading daily paper for the democratic center and liberal movements, with the largest circulation and a reputation for reliability. Following Antons Benjamiņš' tenure as editor-in-chief, Jānis Kārkliņš assumed the position in 1921; Ernests Runcis-Arnis in 1928; and Pēteris Blaus in 1937–40. Jaunākās Ziņas′ printing run on workdays was approximately 160,000 copies; on Sundays, 200,000. The paper's popularity was attributable to its mix of timely information on current events and publication of serialized popular novels, such as Tarzan, and debuts of new literature, including the poetry of Rainis.

The newspaper ceased to exist with the Soviet occupation of Latvia. Emīlija Benjamiņa was subject to the 1941 Soviet deportations from Latvia and died in the Usollag Gulag forced labor camp.
