= Kikeriki =

Austrian magazine (1861–1933)

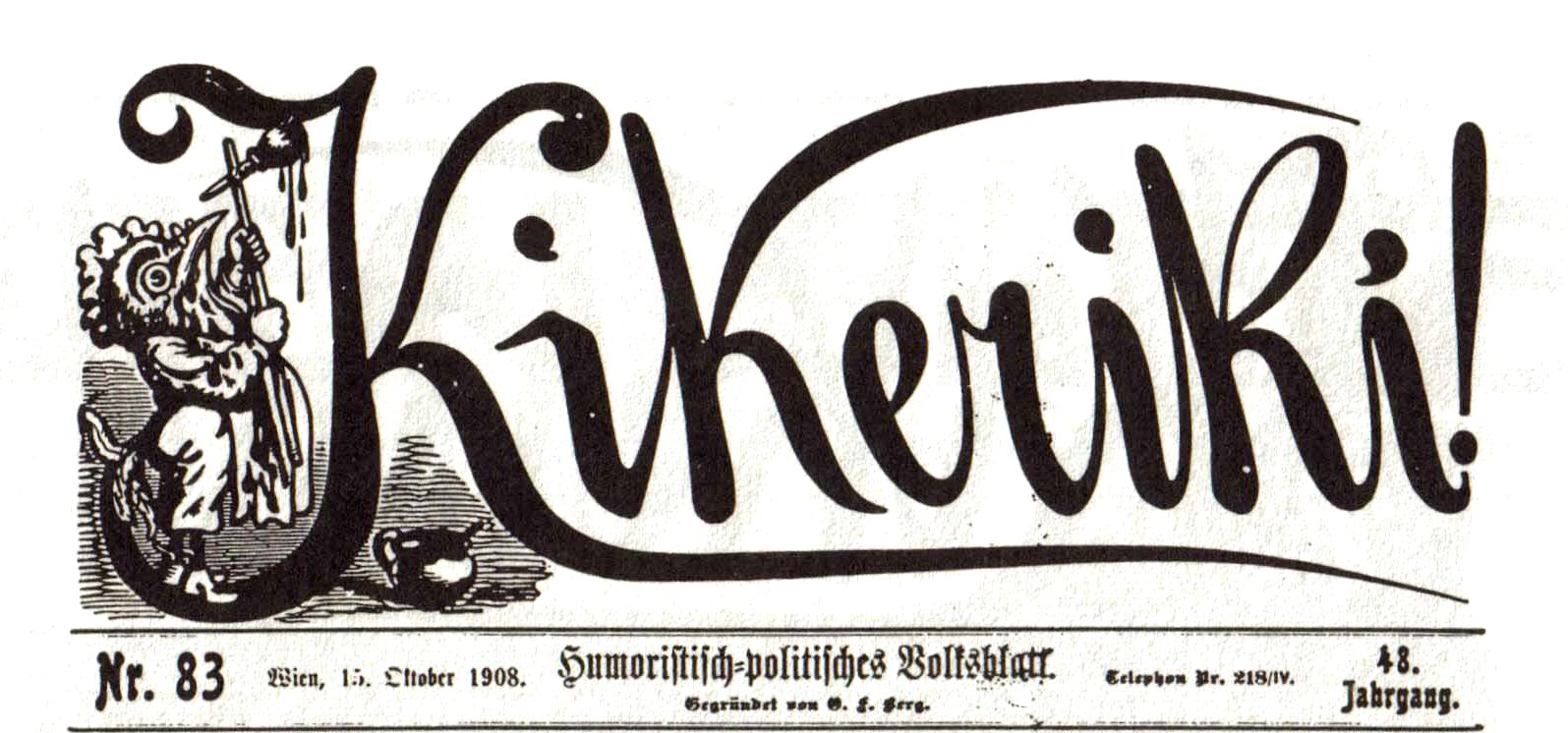
Title page

The Kikeriki (Cock-a-doodle-doo) was a satirical magazine published in Vienna, Austria, between 1861 and 1933.

== History ==
It was founded in 1861 by Ottokar Franz Ebersberg, a journalist and playwright who wrote under the pseudonym O. F. Berg. The paper was successful and popular until the time of the First Republic. In the best times the circulation was 25,000 copies.

Until the 1880s the paper had a liberal orientation. Under the increasing influence of the right-wing's Christians around Karl Lueger, Kikeriki became sharply anti-Semitic. After the First World War the paper politically approached the Deutschnationalen and since the mid 1920s also the Nationalsozialistische Deutsche Arbeiterpartei Österreichs – Hitlerbewegung (Austrian NSDAP). In 1933, because of his partisanship of the Reich German National Socialists who came to power on January 30, the Kikeriki was prohibited by the Austrofascist Party Government of Engelbert Dollfuß.
