= Davul (magazine) =

Magazine published in the Ottoman Empire

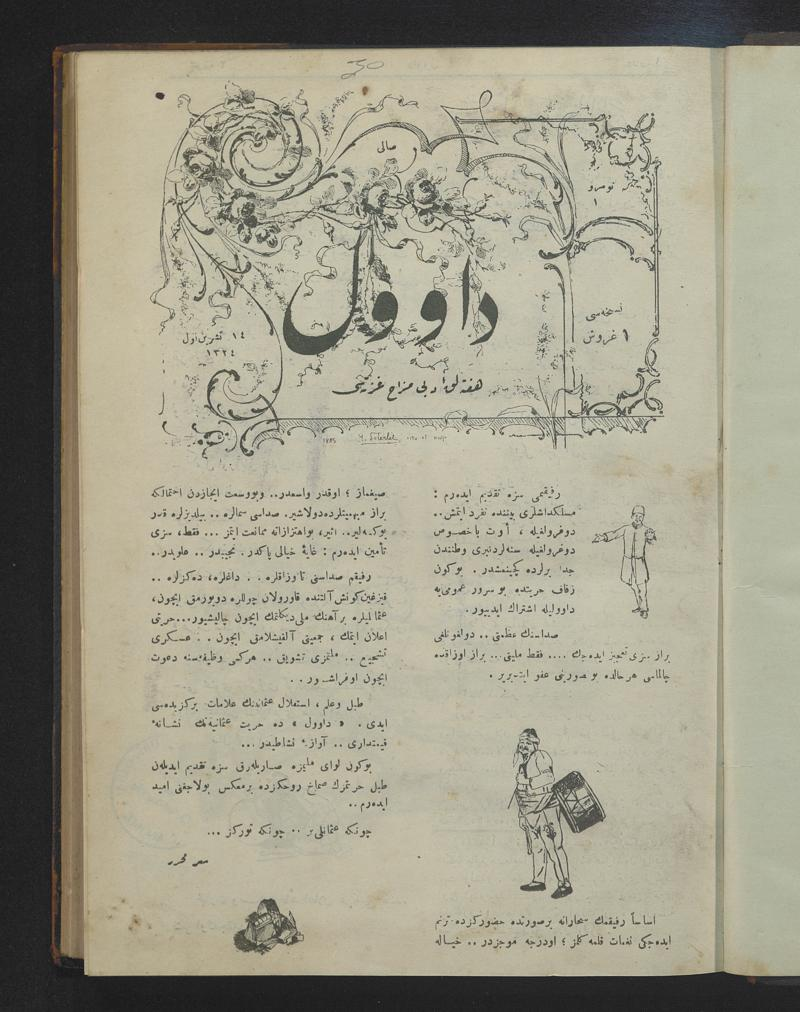
- Categories: Satirical magazine
- Frequency: Weekly
- Publisher: Hasan Vasıf
- Founded: 27 October 1908
- Final issue: 27 May 1909
- Country: Ottoman Empire
- Based in: Istanbul
- Language: Ottoman Turkish
- Website: Davul

Davul (Ottoman Turkish: داوول, lit. 'Drum') was an Ottoman satirical magazine, published in Istanbul weekly between 27 October 1908 and 27 May 1909 in a total of 24 issues. It was edited by Hasan Vasıf (1889-1944), an Ottoman politician and physician. The magazine's illustrations and caricatures deal with the Ottoman and European politics of that time. In their humorous articles the authors criticize i.a. Abdülhamid II, Ottoman policies and the European way of life. In addition, excerpts of the French magazine Fantasie in the French language were published in some issues.

The Chicago Ottoman Microfilms Project, initiated by the University of Chicago in 1985, archived the issues of Davul.
