= The Mugdown =

Satirical college newspaper

- Categories: Humor magazine
- Founded: 2014
- Based in: Texas A&M University; College Station, Texas, US
- Website: mugdown.com

The Mugdown is a satirical student newspaper at Texas A&M University in College Station, Texas. The paper's stated goal is to "challenge the thinking of the Texas A&M community by delivering relevant satirical news" and commonly features content satirizing topics such as campus sports, politics, religious life, and the Corps of Cadets. The paper's name comes from the Aggie tradition of "mugging down", or kissing one's date, during midnight yell and when the Aggie Football Team scores during a football game.

The writers and editors, who publish under pseudonyms for the duration of their work on the paper, customarily reveal their true identities upon completion of their senior year in what is referred to as "Senior Coming Out Day".

== Involvement In Student Government ==
The Mugdown has played various roles tangentially related to Texas A&M's student government organization throughout its years of operation. In 2016 it hosted a live debate for Yell Leader candidates and in 2017 it ran a satirical campaign for student body president with proceeds from campaign merchandise sales being donated to charitable causes. On multiple occasions the newspaper, stylizing itself as a cartoon man with an upside-down coffee mug upon its head, has launched satirical campaigns for student government, encouraging voters to write-in The Mugdown for every elected position on the ballot.
