= Atpūta =

Illustrated weekly magazine in Latvia (1924–1940)

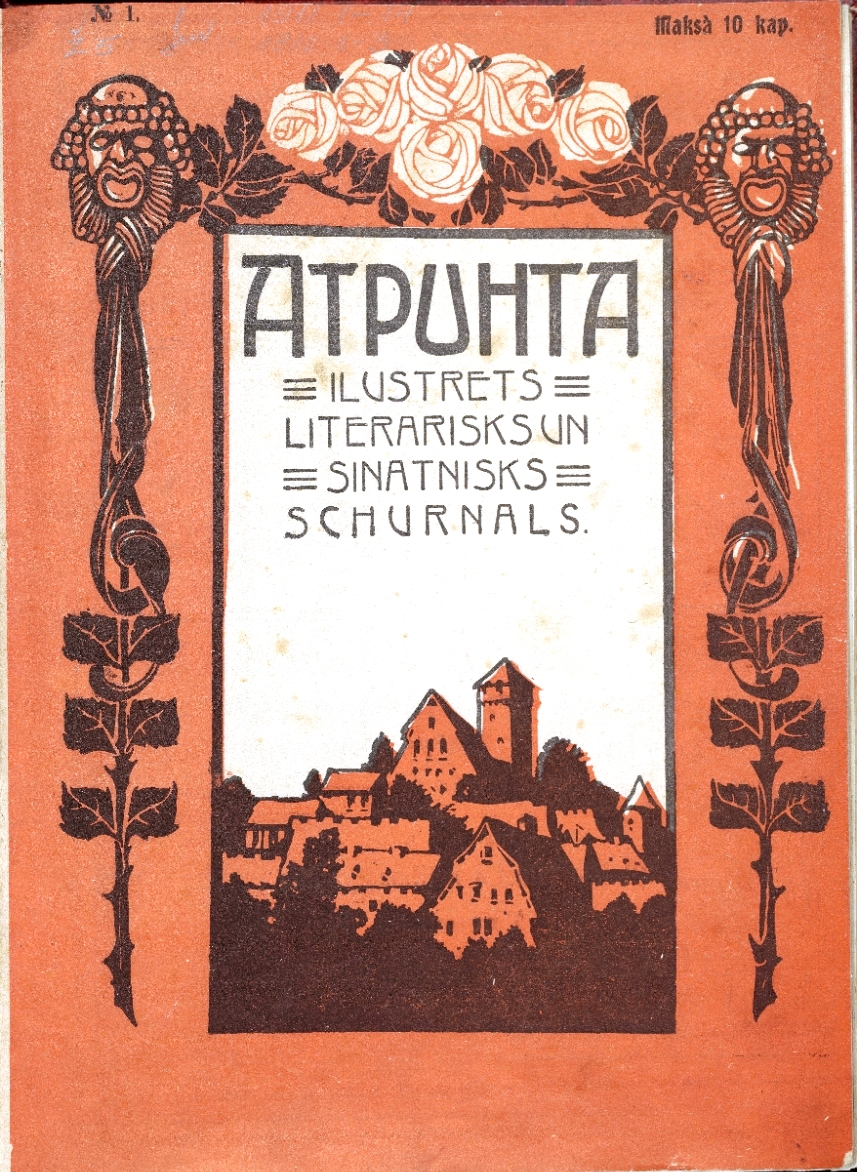
- Cover of the first edition (in 1911)
- Categories: Illustrated magazine
- Frequency: Weekly
- Publisher: Benjamiņš Publishing
- Founder: Emīlija Benjamiņa; Antons Benjamiņš
- Founded: 1911; 1924
- Final issue: 1912; 1940
- Country: Latvia
- Language: Latvian

Atpūta (Latvian: Leisure) was a weekly illustrated magazine which was published in Latvia between 1911 and 1912 and then from 1924 and 1940. It was the most read popular magazine in the 1920s and in the 1930s. The magazine was one of the publications which presented the applied arts, particularly women's handicrafts, as well as the wearing of national costume as instances of the Latvian national identity.

== History and profile ==
Atpūta was first launched on 1 May 1911 as an illustrated magazine for literature and science, with AAntons Benjamiņš serving as chief editor. However, in early 1912 he quit together with issue Haims Blankenšteins, and the magazine folded in the end of 1912.

Atpūta was revived by Emīlija Benjamiņa and her husband Antons Benjamiņš in 1924. They also owned publishing company of the magazine, Benjamiņš Publishing, which also produced the newspaper entitled Jaunākās Ziņas. Atpūta came out weekly. The magazine was modeled on the illustrated Latvian magazine Ilustrēts Žurnāls and other illustrated European magazines.

Atpūta managed to develop its own style over time and covered articles on popular science, fashion, and humor. It also contained puzzles for children and illustrated news reports about the current events. One of the topics covered in the magazine was information-related to the households such as the use of plants as natural dyes. The magazine reported news about the construction of the new Latvian schools in 1933.

The Latvian painter Reinholds Kasparsons was the illustrator of Atpūta. Margarita Kovaļevska, a Latvian artist, also produced drawings for the magazine. Jūlijs Lācis was the editor-in-chief of the magazine between 1937 and 1940.

Atpūta became one of the best-selling publications with a circulation of 70,600 copies over time. The magazine folded in 1940 after the arrest of its publishers by the occupying Soviet forces.
