= Dadzis =

Latvian magazine (1957–1995)

Dadzis ("bur") was a Latvian satire magazine which was launched in January 1957. The magazine had its headquarters in Rīga. It frequently featured cartoons, humors, satirical articles about criticizing bureaucrats. However, it was a semi-official publication of the communist government during the Soviet occupation of Latvia.

Latvian-Israeli-American artist Māris Bišofs is among the former contributors of the magazine. It sold 76,400 copies in 1970. The original edition of Dadzis folded in 1995, however the magazine was relaunched in October 2005. The second edition of Dadzis ceased publication in February 2009.
