= Svari =

Latvian satirical magazine (1906–1930)

- Categories: Satirical magazine
- Publisher: Müllera drukātava
- Founded: 1906
- Final issue: 1931
- Country: Latvia
- Based in: Saint Petersburg (1906–1907); Riga (1921–1930)
- Language: Latvian

Svari (Latvian: Scales) was an illustrated Latvian satirical magazine which was published from 1906 to 1907 in Saint Petersburg, Russian Empire, and then, from 1920 to 1931 in Riga, Latvia.

== History and profile ==
Svari was established in Saint Petersburg, the capital of the Russian Empire, by Latvian journalists in 1906 and folded next year. The art critic Alfrēds Purics was the editor of the magazine during this period. It was restarted in Riga, the capital of newly-independent Latvia, in 1920 and was published by Müllera drukātava (Latvian: Müller printing house).

Svari featured political cartoons and content. It had an anti-Bolshevik political stance. Juris Puriņš, a Latvian satirist working for the magazine, developed an analogy between Bolsheviks and insects.

Rihards Zariņš was one of the cartoonists of the magazine. Svari folded in 1931.
