= José Nakens =

Spanish journalist, anticlerical, and republican activist

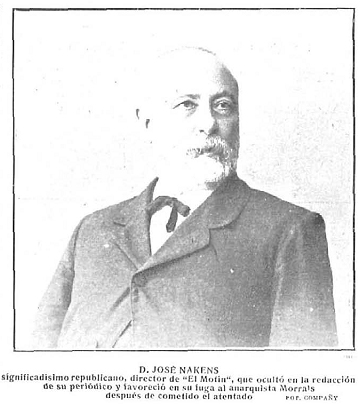
- Born: November 21, 1841; Seville, Spain
- Died: November 12, 1926 (aged 84); Madrid, Spain

José Nakens (1841–1926) was a Spanish journalist, anticlerical, and republican activist.

== Morral affair ==
Following his attempted bombing of Spanish King Alfonso XIII's vehicle on return from his wedding in May 1906, which killed 24 bystanders and military, wounded over 100, and left the royals unscathed, the anarchist fugitive Mateo Morral sought refuge from Nakens. Nakens was a vocal opponent of anarchism, but his anticlerical leadership attracted such radicals. Historians have disagreed as to whether Morral's choice of approaching Nakens was premeditated, but Morral was likely introduced to Nakens through Ferrer's school, which purchased the journalist's anticlerical writings. Morral introduced himself as the assassin upon entering Nakens' printing press and recounted how Nakens had previously helped Michele Angiolillo, the Italian anarchist who had assassinated the Spanish Prime Minister in 1897. Nakens was hesitant but agreed to help. He hid Morral at the press while arranging lodging for Morral, and returned 90 minutes later to transport him to a friend's house for the night. But Morral grew distrustful during the night and was gone by morning. The fugitive died a day later.

On the day of Morral's death, the republican journalist José Nakens had published a denunciation of the regicide attempt and terrorism writ large in his journal, El Motín, without mentioning Morral or Nakens' own harboring of the fugitive. He was arrested within the week and the next day published a full accounting of his actions in two newspapers, in which he reaffirmed his opposition to anarchism, described Morral's attack as cowardly, and recanted his brief support of Morral as misguided but driven by his desire to help his fellow man.

The judgement in Nakens' case came easily. While the court believed that Nakens had no prior connection with Morral, they found that his planning for Morral was more deliberate than a brief lapse of judgement. They argued that this aid led to Morral's pre-suicide murder of a villager, and for this aid, sentenced Nakens to nine years of prison and financial restitution for the Royals, the military, and families affected by the bombing. Nakens' friends Bernardo Mata and Isidro Ibarra were jailed as well. Only half of his prison time between his June 1906 arrest and June 1907 sentencing was commuted. For Nakens' initial months, he could not bear to read the newspapers and was not aware of the republican campaign for his royal pardon.

In Madrid's Cárcel Modelo prison, Nakens became an advocate for prison reform. He received unlimited space in a republican daily newspaper, El País, where he wrote about sordid prison conditions and, in turn, improved his standing with those previously upset by his harboring of Morral. Nakens wrote about prisoner malnourishment, disease, lack of heating, neglect from underpaid guards, and uncomforting clergy. He renewed calls for a more secular and humane prison system as a platform that combined his anticlericalism with the issue of prison reform.

Simultaneously, a campaign mounted for Nakens' pardon. Even before his sentencing, republican papers called for his release, the prime minister and his cabinet received international letters daily, and prison officials described Nakens as a reformed, model prisoner. Ultimately, President Antonio Maura recommended the pardon of Nakens and his friends in May 1908, which Alfonso XIII granted.

The affair spotlighted Spanish republican fissures that would become an identity crisis, as Nakens impatiently broke from the gradualist philosophy of the old generation of republicans and both republican factions showed intransigence towards cooperation. Fallout from the affair appeared to favor the republican moderates (Gumersindo de Azcárate, Nicolás Salmerón), who condemned the radical, young republicans (Alejandro Lerroux, Vicente Blasco Ibáñez) and made Nakens appear, by juxtaposition, to be unstable. This schism appeared to hasten the coming revolution.

In hindsight, historian Enrique Sanabria proposes Nakens as a tragic parable: that Nakens' decision to hide Morral reflected a willingness to work with revolutionaries that, when pronounced, would ostracize him from his more moderate republican colleagues. Nakens was shortsighted to believe that his messages of egalitarianism, democracy, and cultural revolution would not appeal to the leftists he sought to avoid, and his popularity within anarchist and radical circles reflected anticlericalism's status as a uniting force across the left. But whereas anticlericalism was attached to nationalism for republicans like Nakens, it was not necessarily attached for anarchists and socialists. Nakens "became political roadkill" in the aftermath of the affair for his inability to draw an audience of workers while tolerating their revolutionary politics.

== Renewed anticlericalism ==
Upon his release from prison, Nakens worked out of poverty until he could reopen El Motín in October 1908. Further radicalized, he planned to make radical anticlericalism its primary message. The periodical was present through the dictatorship of Miguel Primo de Rivera.

== Bibliography ==
- Sanabria, Enrique A. (2009). "Republicanism, Anarchism, Anticlericalism, and the Attempted Regicide of 1906". Republicanism and Anticlerical Nationalism in Spain. New York: Palgrave Macmillan. pp. 101–122. ISBN 978-0-230-61331-7.
