= News satire =

Type of parody presented in a format typical of mainstream journalism

News satire or news comedy is a type of parody presented in a format typical of mainstream journalism, and called a satire because of its content. News satire has been around almost as long as journalism itself, but it is particularly popular on the web, with websites like The Onion and The Babylon Bee, where it is relatively easy to mimic a legitimate news site. News satire relies heavily on irony and deadpan humor.

Two slightly different types of news satire exist. One form uses satirical commentary and sketch comedy to comment on real-world events, while the other presents wholly fictionalized news stories.

== In history ==
Author Samuel Clemens (Mark Twain) was employed as a newspaper reporter before becoming famous as a novelist, and in this position he published many satirical articles. He left two separate journalism positions, Nevada (1864) fleeing a challenge to duel and San Francisco fleeing outraged police officials because his satire and fiction were often taken for the truthful accounts they were presented as. Ironically, the accuracy of many newspaper and autobiographical accounts used to follow the early life of Samuel Clemens is in doubt.

Newspapers still print occasional news satire features, in particular on April Fools' Day. This news is specifically identified somewhere in the paper or in the next day as a joke.

In 1933 and 1934, Metro-Goldwyn-Mayer released a series of ten one-reel theatrical shorts called Goofy Movies, which included "Wotaphony Newsreel", a newsreel parody that paired actual footage with a mocking, deadpan narration.

Also in 1934, halfway through a Kraft Music Hall radio show, Dean Taylor ("Others collect the news, Dean makes it!") narrated a fake newsreel which began with a report on the New York Giants and Philadelphia Phillies being cancelled due to bad weather, and baseball season being rescheduled to when farmers need rain.

== On television ==
News satire has been prevalent on television since the 1960s, when it enjoyed a renaissance in the UK with the "Satire Boom", led by comedians including Peter Cook, Alan Bennett, Jonathan Miller, David Frost, Eleanor Bron, and Dudley Moore, and the television program That Was The Week That Was. In the United States, the NBC network adapted this program and also produced its own content, from the "news" segment of Rowan and Martin's Laugh-In, to the still-running Saturday Night Live mock newscast segment "Weekend Update". Cable television got into the cable news act with HBO's Not Necessarily the News in the mid-1980s.

In 1993, Comedy Central would premiere Politically Incorrect with Bill Maher; it was structured as an informal roundtable show, featuring Maher and a rotating group of guest panelists—often including a mix of entertainers, pundits, and public figures—discussing news and political topics. Maher described the program as being akin to "The McLaughlin Group on acid." In 1997, the series moved to ABC, being positioned as a competitor to the late-night talk shows The Tonight Show and Late Show. It was cancelled in 2002 in the wake of controversial remarks made by Maher and guest Dinesh D'Souza on an episode regarding the September 11 attacks, with ABC picking up a more conventional late-night show starring Jimmy Kimmel to replace it. In 2003, Maher moved to HBO to host Real Time with Bill Maher, which has a similar format.

After Politically Incorrect moved to ABC, Comedy Central developed The Daily Show as a replacement, which took the form of a satirical newscast interspersed with field reports, discussions between other "correspondents", and features such as celebrity interviews. Initially hosted by Craig Kilborn, he would step down in 1998 to succeed Tom Snyder as host of The Late Late Show on CBS. Kilborn was succeeded on The Daily Show by Jon Stewart; during his tenure, the show's content evolved to have a larger focus on comedic discussions of political news.

A number of other news comedy programs have been hosted by Daily Show alumni; in 2005, Comedy Central premiered The Colbert Report, a Daily Show spinoff featuring Stephen Colbert portraying a narcissistic cable news pundit in the vein of Fox News personalities such as Bill O'Reilly and Sean Hannity. Colbert would leave The Colbert Report in 2014 to succeed David Letterman as host of Late Show, with his tenure premiering in September 2015 as The Late Show with Stephen Colbert. His tenure on the show would incorporate news satire similar to The Daily Show. Stewart stepped down as host of The Daily Show in August 2015 to join The Late Show as an executive producer and occasional contributor; he was succeeded by Trevor Noah. The Colbert Report was replaced by the short-lived Daily Show spinoff The Nightly Show with Larry Wilmore, which ran from January 2015 to August 2016. After a positively-received run as a guest host on The Daily Show in 2013, HBO signed John Oliver to host the weekly series Last Week Tonight in 2014. Fellow Daily Show correspondent Samantha Bee moved to her own show—Full Frontal with Samantha Bee—on TBS in 2015. In 2024, Stewart returned to hosting The Daily Show on a weekly basis, as part of a rotation of hosts that have helmed the show since the departure of Trevor Noah.

Amid the success of The Daily Show, Fox News launched its own news satire program in February 2007—The ½ Hour News Hour. Owing to the channel's positioning towards conservatives, the program was described by creator Joel Surnow as being less sympathetic towards left-leaning figures than its competitors, saying that it would focus on targets "that have been missed by the mainstream satirists on TV". The series was cancelled in September 2007. Fox News then launched the more successful series Red Eye, a satirical talk show which ran from February 6, 2007 to April 7, 2017; it was initially hosted by Greg Gutfeld, who would later go on to host the similar Greg Gutfeld Show. In 2021, the show expanded from weekends to a weeknight schedule as Gutfeld!

In the United Kingdom, a number of notable news satires have been produced on radio and television. A popular format are comedy panel shows such as Have I Got News for You and Mock the Week, where panels of comedians participate in improv-based quizzes and games related to stories from the past week. Chris Morris has produced a number of satirical miniseries; The Day Today (1994)—an adaptation of Morris's radio comedy On the Hour—parodied the formats of British television newscasts of the era, including the overuse of dramatic music and graphics, bizarre headlines and production decisions, and also featured satires of television documentaries, true crime programs such as Crimewatch, and MTV. The series notably introduced Steve Coogan's character Alan Partridge, an inept and egocentric sportscaster who would star in other radio and television sitcoms. In 1997, The Day Today received a follow-up in Brass Eye, which specifically satirized investigative journalism. sensationalism, and moral panics; the series proved controversial prior to airing due to its use of pranks against unwitting public figures, including an episode where politician David Amess was duped into recording a video warning the public about a fictitious drug known as "Cake". Four years after its conclusion, a one-off special entitled "Paedogeddon" aired in 2001.

Recent news satire television series in Australia include Working Dog Productions' Frontline, Shaun Micallef's Newstopia, and the many programs created by The Chaser since 2001. As of 2017, current programs of the Australian Broadcasting Corporation include Shaun Micallef's Mad as Hell and The Weekly with Charlie Pickering.

The Canadian series This Hour Has 22 Minutes has aired since 1993 on CBC Television; it utilizes an ensemble cast of studio "anchors" presenting satirical headlines and stories, intercut with sketches such as interviews and parody commercials. The program's title references the CBC's 1960's newsmagazine This Hour Has Seven Days; although primarily a real news magazine, that show did feature some satirical features in its format, such as political comedy songs performed by actress and singer Dinah Christie. CBC Radio One features This Is That, an improvised news satire program which mimics the style of actual CBC Radio public affairs programs. In Quebec, Marc Labrèche hosted the French-language news satire La Fin du monde est à 7 heures on TQS. After its conclusion, 7 heures cast member Jean-René Dufort would later go on to host Infoman for the CBC's French arm Radio-Canada.

In Germany, heute-show (ZDF), and formerly Wochenshow (on SAT.1) are popular news satires on TV.

The Egyptian show El Bernameg, hosted by Bassem Youssef (on Capital Broadcast Center 2011-13 and MBC MASR from 2014 on), is modeled on The Daily Show. Launched in the wake of the Egyptian Revolution of 2011, it has been quite popular, but also a source of tremendous controversy, as Youssef has repeatedly been under investigation by the authorities for his willingness to poke fun at powerful people.

== Online ==
News satire has been posted on the web almost since its inception, with The Onion foremost among recognized news satire sites due to its enduring and profitable business model. The content of the website, which started in 1996, is syndicated through mainstream media sites such as CNN and CNET. Today there are hundreds of news satire sites online, among which The Babylon Bee, considered the politically conservative counterpart of The Onion and also the more visited of the two. Sites such as Hollywood Leek specialize in satirical articles about celebrities and Hollywood entertainment news. Sometimes fake news reporters influence real world politics, like Citizen Kate whose 90 episodes covered the 2008 presidential campaign trail. She commissioned a butter bust of Obama presented to him by the Butter Cow Lady of Iowa, making international headlines. El Koshary Today is an Egyptian website that carries fake international news stories. Other satire sites attempt to emulate a genuine news source of some sort; these sites now take a variety of forms.

Because interesting stories are often emailed and can quickly become separated from their point of origin, it is not uncommon for news satire stories to be picked up as real by the media, as happened with a Faking News story about a lawsuit against Axe by an Indian man after having failed to attract a girl. Additionally, a parody post on Al Sharpton's parody News Groper blog was quoted as if real by MSNBC. Another satire publication, The Giant Napkin, published an article about a man literally fighting his house fire with more fire, a story taken seriously by several social networking sites. That Google News accepts news satire sources helps contribute to this phenomenon; while Google News does mark such stories with a "satire" tag, not all readers notice the tag; moreover, sometimes satirical sources may not carry the tag. At least one site, thespoof.com, relies on user-generated content in a Web 2.0 manner.

Some websites like Literally Unbelievable post the genuine and shocked reactions of individuals who believe the satirical articles are real. The reactions are taken from social media websites, such as Facebook, in which users can directly comment on links to the article's source.

Multi-author Indian website News That Matters Not, launched in November 2009, won a Manthan South Asia Award for socially responsible e-content (Digital Inclusion for Development), organized by Digital Empowerment Foundation. In India, several community-based news satire websites have crept up in recent times. Their popularity on Facebook defines that they are popular amongst the masses. Very new websites such as The Scoop Times, Fakekhabar.com, Sunkey.co.in and The UnReal Times also claim to be run by students, and were covered in The Times of India in July 2011.

A plethora of news satire sites participate in a hosted community site, which additionally runs its own satire news feed on HumorFeed. HumorFeed is notable for its relatively high standards of admission and active community involvement. At present, over 60 sites are contributing members, at least eight of which have published books and two of which publish regular hard-copy periodicals. Several HumorFeed members also run Check Please!, an online journal devoted to the serious examination of online satire, ranging from its role in relation to actual journalism to practical considerations of producing an online satire site.

In July 2009, a satire piece about Kanye West published on the website ScrapeTV was picked up by numerous media outlets and reported as factual, despite disclaimers on the site.

Satirical Twitter accounts of news sources are popular, and they are often mistaken as legitimate sources. Online publications have made quizzes challenging users to distinguish between the tweets of the real Vice and the tweets of their parodies. The @Salondotcom parody account confused so many Twitter users that the real Salon.com reported them for impersonation.

In Pakistan, Khabaristan Times (KT) is a renowned satire and parody website with its commentary on Pakistani politics and the military. In 2015, a satirical piece by the website went viral and international media outlets including The New York Times reported the story as if it were true. In 2017, KT was reportedly blocked in Pakistan, however, it appeared to be available to users outside Pakistan.

In the Middle East, The Pan-Arabia Enquirer is the most widely read satirical news website. It gained notoriety in 2013 when an article about Emirates launching shisha lounges on its fleet of A380s was picked up as fact by news websites around the world. AlHudood, another middle eastern satire news publisher, has gained publicity in the region when they published an article about the Jordanian police arresting Santa Claus and confiscating all of his gifts for not paying the customs before entering Jordan.

In Turkey, Zaytung has become a source of mass reading since the socio-political Gezi Park 2013 protests in Turkey.

In the Caribbean, Trinidad and Tobago-based website Wired868 has two satirical columnists under the pseudonyms Mr Live Wire and Filbert Street, who comment satirically on relevant political and news stories such as the fall from power of ex-FIFA vice-president Jack Warner, media issues, general news and the challenges faced by former Prime Minister Kamla Persad-Bissessar and her People's Partnership coalition Government.

In Australia, there are numerous satirical news websites including The Damascus Dropbear (Christian satire), The Shovel, The Betoota Advocate, The (Un)Australian, The Fault Report, The Sauce and The Tunnel Presents. The Shovel mainly satirizes the Australian political and social culture and The Betoota Advocate satirizes the political right and Australian journalism. In February 2015, The Betoota Advocate shot to fame after the publication's editor's sneaked in to the media scrum outside Parliament House in Canberra during a leadership spill motion and managed to interview some of Australia's most high-profile media personalities and politicians, posing as legitimate journalists. The fallout from The Betoota Advocate stunt has led to a security increase surrounding parliamentary media and screening of all crew. The Fault Report was established in 2014 and also has a political editorial focus. British-born Australian author John Birmingham once described The Fault Report as, "Like The Onion. But with Vegemite", on his blog Cheeseburger Gothic. The Tunnel Presents, which has been online since June 2011, is by Brisbane-based satire writing team The Tunnel and has political and social satire stories with a Queensland focus.

In Italy, the most famous website specialized in mock-journalism is Lercio. Born as a parody of the popular press, but in addition to the tabloid press, its goals are also the domestic and foreign politics. The website was created in the 2012 and the editorial staff is composed of authors who have contributed to La Palestra, a column wanted on his blog by the comedian and satirical author Daniele Luttazzi. In few years Lercio saw the publication of a book with a collection of 2014 best articles. From the same year Lercio it is present on the national radio with a daily strip. Thanks to the many fans the articles are shared on the social network with a good success and, mostly in the beginning of his history, some articles were taken as true by the national press.

In Hungary, HírCsárda is the number one news satire medium. The site, started in 2010, has drawn public attention after the Hungarian government demanded that an article should be emended that dealt with the then state secretary of education Rózsa Hoffmann. The page has since been threatened by various celebrities, but has remained active regardless. Also present in Hungary is Központi Újság (Central News), a news satire website of the joke party, Hungarian Two Tailed Dog Party.

Popular Canadian satirical news websites include The Beaverton, The Daily Bonnet, and Walking Eagle News.

== Impact ==
The 2004 National Annenberg Election Survey found that Daily Show viewers were better informed than those who relied solely on conventional network news, and Steven Young of Los Angeles Daily News compared the trust and influence that long-time host Jon Stewart enjoyed to that of CBS anchor Walter Cronkite in the 1970s. A study published in the Journal of Communication suggested that news entertainment shows such as The Daily Show and The Colbert Report may not be as influential in teaching voters about political issues and candidates as was previously thought. Researchers from Ohio State University have found reasons to discount how effective these shows are in informing the general public. People watching television news learned more about a candidate's position on issues and about political procedures compared to those watching the news entertainment shows, while news entertainment shows primarily taught viewers about a candidate's personal background.

== See also ==
- List of satirical television news programs
- List of satirical news websites
- List of satirical magazines
