= Citizen Kate =

Mockumentary film series

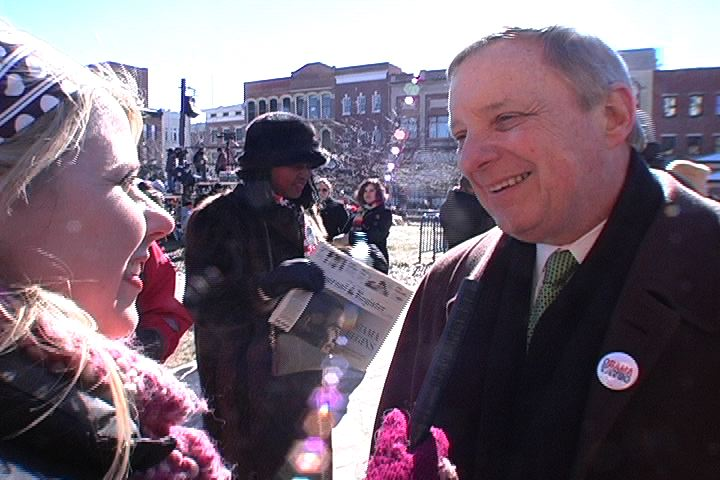
Citizen Kate interviewing Senator Dick Durbin

Citizen Kate is a mockumentary series about a fictional citizen journalist named Kate on the actual presidential campaign trail that has been produced in 2008 and in 2016 by Viva Lundin Productions of Chicago and Los Angeles. The series was created by Carey Lundin who, as an award-winning producer of political campaign spots, always wanted to follow the presidential campaign.

Without any experience in either politics or reporting, Citizen Kate attends political events, where she talks with senators, delegates, and presidential candidates in order to uncover the political process. Citizen Kate has been described as a "half valley girl, half Michael Moore".

The Tribune story was also picked up by The Economist Global Technology Forum. In April 2007, YouTube's CitizenTube editor highlighted Citizen Kate's "crush" on Obama and demonstration of "serious pluck" in the YouTube Staff Picks of the Week.

In 2024, Citizen Kate was relaunched as @RealCitizenKate or @Real_CitizenKate to cover the 2024 Presidential campaign trail. WORT Radio interviewed Kate about Christian Nationalism.
