= The Pan-Arabia Enquirer =

Satirical news website

- Website type: Satire
- Website: http://www.panarabiaenquirer.com/
- Commercial: Yes
- Launched: 2010
- Current status: Active

The Pan-Arabia Enquirer is an English-language satirical website that is often likened to The Onion of the Middle East. It was started in 2010 and has garnered praise for its humour and insight into regional current affairs and cultural observations, as well as having had its stories picked up in the real press. In June 2013, an article about the airline Emirates launching shisha lounges on board its fleet of A380s went viral and was reprinted as fact across international publications. A story in March 2014 that claimed Qatar had banned UAE, Saudi and Bahraini citizens from entering Harrod's department store in London following a political dispute was picked up by the largest English language newspaper in Pakistan, The News International, which ran it as part of an op-ed on the front page.

In January 2014, The Pan-Arabia Enquirer held an exhibition at the Dubai-based DUCTAC centre.

In August 2014, The Pan-Arabia Enquirer deleted an article in which it claimed PR company Bell Pottinger had won a deal to represent the Islamic State. A subsequent tongue-in-cheek public apology regarding the article later went viral on social media.
