= List of Senegalese films =

A list by year of films produced in Senegal, many in the French or Wolof language:

Title	Director	Cast	Year
Afrique-sur-Seine	Paulin Soumanou Vieyra, Jacques Mélo Kane, Mamadou Sarr		1955
Liberté I	Yves Ciampi		1961
Borom Sarret	Ousmane Sembène		1963
Niaye	Ousmane Sembène		1964
N'Diongane	Paulin Soumanou Vieyra		1965
La Noire de...	Ousmane Sembène		1966
Mandabi	Ousmane Sembène		1968
Contras'city	Djibril Diop Mambéty		1969
Badou Boy	Djibril Diop Mambéty		1970
Tauw	Ousmane Sembène		1970
Emitaï	Ousmane Sembène		1971
Touki Bouki	Djibril Diop Mambéty		1973
Xala	Ousmane Sembène		1975
Kaddu Beykat (Lettre paysanne)	Safi Faye		1976
Ceddo	Ousmane Sembène		1977
Fad'jal (Arrive Travaille)	Safi Faye		1973
Camp de Thiaroye	Ousmane Sembène		1988
Hyènes	Djibril Diop Mambéty		1992
Guelwaar	Ousmane Sembène		1993
Le Franc	Djibril Diop Mambéty		1994
Mossane	Safi Faye		1996
Tableau Ferraille	Moussa Sène Absa		1997
TGV	Moussa Touré		1998
La Petite Vendeuse de Soleil (The Little Girl who Sold the Sun)	Djibril Diop Mambéty		1999
Faat Kiné	Ousmane Sembène		2000
Almodou	Amadou Thior		2000
Ainsi Meurent les Anges	Moussa Sène Absa		2001
L'Afrance	Alain Gomis		2001
Ndeysan - Le Prix du Pardon	Mansour Sora Wade		2001
Karmen Geï	Joseph Gaï Ramaka		2001
Le Déchaussé	Laurence Attali		2002
Madame Brouette (L'Extraordinaire destin de Madame Brouette)	Moussa Sène Absa		2002
Fisabillahi	Aïcha Thiam		2003
Traces, empreintes de femmes	Katy Léna N'diaye		2003
Moolaadé	Ousmane Sembène		2004
Un Amour d'Enfant	Ben Diogaye Beye		2004
L'Appel des Arènes	Cheikh N'diaye		2005
Bul Déconné	Massaër Dieng, Marc Picavez		2005
L'Appel des arènes	Cheikh Ndiaye		2005
Afrique, la parole essentielle	Ibrahima Sarr		2005
Gabil le pagne magique	Aïcha Thiam		2005
Andalucia	Alain Gomis		2007
Ramata	Léandre-Alain Baker		2007
Teranga Blues	Moussa Sène Absa		2007
Les Feux de Mansaré	Mansour Sora Wade		2009
Les Larmes de l'émigration	Alassane Diago		2010
Yoolé, The Sacrifice	Moussa Sène Absa		2011
Today (Tey)	Alain Gomis		2012
The Pirogue	Moussa Touré		2012
Des étoiles	Dyana Gaye		2013
Dakar Trottoirs	Hubert Laba Ndao		2013
Le Cheval Blanc	Adams Sie		2015
Sembene!	Samba Gadjigo, Jason Silverman		2015
Bois d'Ébène	Moussa Touré		2015
Félicité	Alain Gomis		2017
Nafi's Father	Mamadou Dia		2019
Atlantics	Mati Diop		2019
