= 71st Sydney Film Festival =

2024 film festival

- Opening film: Midnight Oil: The Hardest Line by Paul Clarke
- Closing film: The Substance by Coralie Fargeat
- Location: Sydney, New South Wales, Australia
- Founded: 1954
- No. of films: 197
- Festival date: 5–16 June 2024
- Website: sff.org.au

Sydney Film Festival
- 72nd 70th

The 71st annual Sydney Film Festival was held from 5 to 16 June 2024. The festival opened with Paul Clarke's documentary film Midnight Oil: The Hardest Line, and closed with Coralie Fargeat's horror film The Substance.

Overall the festival screened 197 films, including 28 world premieres and 133 Australian premieres.

== Juries ==
The Sydney Film Prize jury was headed by Bosnian filmmaker Danis Tanović.

== Official Selection ==
=== In competition ===
The following films were selected for the main international competition:

| English title | Original title | Director(s) | Production country |
|---|---|---|---|
| All We Imagine as Light | | Payal Kapadia | France, India, Netherlands, Luxembourg |
| Dying | Sterben | Matthias Glasner | Germany |
| Grand Tour | | Miguel Gomes | Portugal, France, Italy |
| Kinds of Kindness | | Yorgos Lanthimos | Ireland, United Kingdom, United States |
| Kneecap | | Rich Peppiatt | Ireland, United Kingdom |
| Marcello Mio | | Christophe Honoré | France, Italy |
| Midnight Oil: The Hardest Line | | Paul Clarke | Australia |
| Puan | | María Alché, Benjamín Naishtat | Argentina, Italy, France, Germany, Brazil |
| September Says | | Ariane Labed | France, Germany, Greece, Ireland, United Kingdom |
| Sujo | | Astrid Rondero, Fernanda Valadez | Mexico, United States, France |
| There's Still Tomorrow | C'è ancora domani | Paola Cortellesi | Italy |
| Viet and Nam | Trong lòng đất | Minh Quý Trương | Vietnam, Philippines, Singapore, France, Netherlands |

Highlighted title indicates Sydney Film Prize winner.

=== Special Presentations ===
| English title | Original title | Director(s) | Production country |
|---|---|---|---|
| The Bikeriders | | Jeff Nichols | United States |
| The Convert | | Lee Tamahori | Australia, New Zealand |
| Dahomey | | Mati Diop | France, Senegal, Benin |
| The Dead Don't Hurt | | Viggo Mortensen | Canada, Denmark, Mexico |
| Despicable Me 4 | | Chris Renaud | United States |
| A Different Man | | Aaron Schimberg | United States |
| Green Border | Zielona granica | Agnieszka Holland | Poland, Czechia, France, Belgium |
| Kid Snow | | Paul Goldman | Australia |
| Lee | | Ellen Kuras | United Kingdom |
| The Monk and the Gun | | Pawo Choyning Dorji | Bhutan, Taiwan, France, United States, Hong Kong |
| My Old Ass | | Megan Park | United States |
| The Outrun | | Nora Fingscheidt | United Kingdom, Germany |
| The Pool | | Ian Darling | Australia |
| Porcelain War | | Brendan Bellomo, Slava Leontyev | United States, Ukraine, Australia |
| Touch | Snerting | Baltasar Kormákur | Iceland, United Kingdom |

=== Documentary Australia Award ===
| English title | Director(s) |
|---|---|
| Aquarius | Wendy Champagne |
| The Blind Sea | Daniel Fenech |
| Dale Frank: Nobody's Sweetie | Jenny Hicks |
| Every Little Thing | Sally Aitken |
| Mozart's Sister | Madeleine Hetherton-Miau |
| Otto by Otto | Gracie Otto |
| Skategoat | Van Alpert |
| Welcome to Babel | James Bradley |
| Welcome to Yiddishland | Ros Horin |
| You Should Have Been Here Yesterday | Jolyon Hoff |

=== Features ===
| English title | Original title | Director(s) | Production country |
|---|---|---|---|
| About Dry Grasses | Kuru Otlar Üstüne | Nuri Bilge Ceylan | Turkey, France, Germany, Sweden |
| Achilles | | Farhad Delaram | Iran, Germany, France |
| Alienoid | Oegye+in 1bu | Choi Dong-hoon | South Korea |
| Alienoid: Return to the Future | Euigye+in 2-bu | Choi Dong-hoon | South Korea |
| All Shall Be Well | 從今以後 | Ray Yeung | Hong Kong |
| Armand | | Halfdan Ullmann Tøndel | Norway, Netherlands, Germany, Sweden |
| Brief History of a Family | 家庭简史 | Lin Jianjie | China, Denmark |
| City of Wind | Сэр сэр салхи | Lkhagvadulam Purev-Ochir | France, Mongolia, Portugal, Netherlands, Germany, Qatar |
| Cottontail | | Patrick Dickinson | United Kingdom, Japan |
| Crossing | | Levan Akin | Sweden, Denmark, France, Turkey, Georgia |
| Daddio | | Christy Hall | United States |
| Death of a Whistleblower | | Ian Gabriel | South Africa |
| Do Not Expect Too Much from the End of the World | Nu aștepta prea mult de la sfârșitul lumii | Radu Jude | Romania |
| Eephus | | Carson Lund | United States |
| Essential Truths of the Lake | | Lav Diaz | Philippines |
| Explanation for Everything | Magyarázat mindenre | Gábor Reisz | Hungary, Slovakia |
| Ezra | | Tony Goldwyn | United States |
| Flathead | | Jaydon Martin | Australia |
| Ghostlight | | Kelly O'Sullivan, Alex Thompson | United States |
| He Ain't Heavy | | David Vincent Smith | Australia |
| Hesitation Wound | Tereddüt Çizgisi | Selman Nacar | Turkey, Spain, Romania, France |
| House of the Seasons | | Oh Jung-min | South Korea |
| I Saw the TV Glow | | Jane Schoenbrun | United States |
| In Vitro | | Will Howarth, Tom McKeith | Australia |
| Kneecap | | Rich Peppiatt | Ireland, United Kingdom |
| La cocina | | Alonso Ruizpalacios | Mexico, United States |
| Memory | | Michel Franco | United States |
| The Moon Is Upside Down | | Loren Horsley | New Zealand |
| More Than Strangers | | Sylvie Michel | Greece, Germany |
| Motel Destino | | Karim Aïnouz | Brazil, France, Germany |
| My New Friends | Les gens d’à côté | André Téchiné | France |
| My Sunshine | ぼくのお日さま | Hiroshi Okuyama | Japan |
| One Second Ahead, One Second Behind | | Nobuhiro Yamashita | Japan |
| Paradise | | Prasanna Vithanage | Sri Lanka, India |
| Pepe | | Nelson Carlo De Los Santos Arias | Dominican Republic, Namibia, Germany, France |
| Problemista | | Julio Torres | United States |
| Rapture | | Dominic M. Sangma | India |
| The Rye Horn | O Corno | Jaione Camborda | Spain, Portugal, Belgium |
| Sasquatch Sunset | | David Zellner, Nathan Zellner | United States |
| Sex | | Dag Johan Haugerud | Norway |
| Shambhala | | Min Bahadur Bham | Nepal, France, Norway, Hong Kong, China, Turkey, United States, Qatar, Taiwan |
| Something Like an Autobiography | | Mostofa Sarwar Farooki | Bangladesh |
| Stress Positions | | Theda Hammel | United States |
| Thelma | | Josh Margolin | United States |
| Toll | Pedágio | Carolina Markowicz | Brazil, Portugal |
| Unicorns | | Sally El Hosaini, James Krishna Floyd | United Kingdom, United States, Sweden |
| Veni Vidi Vici | | Daniel Hoesl, Julia Niemann | Austria |
| Woman Of... | Kobieta z... | Małgorzata Szumowska, Michał Englert | Poland, Sweden |

=== International Documentaries ===
| English title | Original title | Director(s) | Production country |
|---|---|---|---|
| Agent of Happiness | | Arun Bhattarai, Dorottya Zurbó | Hungary, Bhutan |
| Among the Wolves | | Tanguy Dumortier, Olivier Larrey | France, Belgium |
| Architecton | | Viktor Kossakovsky | Germany, France, United States |
| Balomania | | Sissel Dargis Morell | Denmark, Spain |
| The Battle for Laikipia | | Daphne Matziaraki, Peter Murimi | Kenya, United States, Greece |
| Black Box Diaries | | Shiori Itō | United States, United Kingdom, Japan |
| Black Snow | | Alina Simone | Denmark, United States |
| The Bones | | Jeremy Xido | Canada, Germany |
| The Cats of Gogoku Shrine | | Kazuhiro Soda | Japan, United States |
| Charmian Clift: Life Burns High | | Rachel Lane | Australia |
| The Contestant | | Clair Titley | United Kingdom |
| Copa 71 | | Rachel Ramsay, James Erskine | United States |
| Ernest Cole: Lost and Found | | Raoul Peck | United States, France |
| Federer: Twelve Final Days | | Asif Kapadia, Joe Sabia | United Kingdom |
| The Flats | | Alessandra Celesia | France |
| Flickering Lights | | Anupama Srinivasan, Anirban Dutta | India |
| The Home Game | Heimaleikurinn | Smari Gunn, Logi Sigursveinsson | Iceland |
| A Horse Named Winx | | Janine Hosking | Australia |
| Ibelin | | Benjamin Ree | Norway |
| In the Rearview | Skąd dokąd | Maciek Hamela | Poland, France, Ukraine |
| Life Is Beautiful | Al Haya Helwa | Mohamed Jabaly | Norway, Palestine |
| Made in England: The Films of Powell and Pressburger | | David Hinton | United Kingdom, United States |
| Menus-Plaisirs – Les Troisgros | | Frederick Wiseman | France |
| My Stolen Planet | | Farahnaz Sharifi | Germany, Iran |
| A New Kind of Wilderness | | Silje Evensmo Jacobsen | Norway |
| No Other Land | | Basel Adra, Hamdan Ballal, Yuval Abraham, Rachel Szor | Palestine, Norway |
| Nocturnes | | Anirban Dutta, Anupama Srinivasan | India, United States |
| Occupied City | | Steve McQueen | United Kingdom, Netherlands, United States |
| Rewards for the Tribe | | Rhys Graham | Australia |
| Skywalkers: A Love Story | | Jeff Zimbalist, >Maria Bukhonina | United States |
| Sugarcane | | Julian Brave NoiseCat, Emily Kassie | United States, Canada |
| Super/Man: The Christopher Reeve Story | | Ian Bonhôte, Peter Ettedgui | United Kingdom, United States |
| Wilding | | David Allen | United Kingdom |

=== Late Announce ===
| English title | Original title | Director(s) | Production country |
|---|---|---|---|
| Black Dog | 狗阵 | Guan Hu | China |
| Caught by the Tides | 风流一代 | Jia Zhangke | China |
| Ernest Cole: Lost and Found | | Raoul Peck | United States, France |
| Ghost Trail | Les Fantômes | Jonathan Millet | France, Germany, Belgium |
| The Girl with the Needle | Pigen med nålen | Magnus von Horn | Denmark, Poland, Sweden |
| Megalopolis | | Francis Ford Coppola | United States |
| Rumours | | Guy Maddin, Evan Johnson, Galen Johnson | Canada, Germany |
| The Seed of the Sacred Fig | دانه انجیر مقدس | Mohammad Rasoulof | Iran, Germany, France |
| The Substance | | Coralie Fargeat | United Kingdom, United States, France |

=== Freak Me Out ===
| English title | Original title | Director(s) | Production country |
|---|---|---|---|
| Cuckoo | | Tilman Singer | Germany, United States |
| Hear My Eyes: Hellraiser | | Clive Barker | United Kingdom, United States |
| Hunting Daze | Jour de chasse | Annick Blanc | Canada |
| KILL | | Nikhil Nagesh Bhat | India |
| The Moogai | | Jon Bell | Australia |
| The Paragon | | Michael Duignan | New Zealand |
| She Loved Blossoms More | | Yannis Veslemes | Greece, France |
| Wake Up | | RKSS | Canada, France |

=== First Nations ===
| English title | Original title | Director(s) | Production country |
|---|---|---|---|
| The Convert | | Lee Tamahori | Australia, New Zealand |
| Ellogierdu: The Tundra Within Me | | Sara Margrethe Oskal | Norway |
| Je'vida | | Katja Gauriloff | Finland |
| Ka Whawhai Tonu | | Michael Jonathan | New Zealand |
| The Moogai | | Jon Bell | Australia |
| The Mountain | | Rachel House | New Zealand |
| We Were Dangerous | | Josephine Stewart-Te Whiu | New Zealand, United States |

=== Sustainable Future ===
| English title | Original title | Director(s) | Production country |
|---|---|---|---|
| The Battle for Laikipia | | Daphne Matziaraki, Peter Murimi | Kenya, United States, Greece |
| Black Snow | | Alina Simone | Denmark, United States |
| The Feast | | Rishi Chandna | India |
| Grove of Giants | | Bree Sanders | Australia |
| The Waiting | | Volker Schlecht | Germany |
| Wilding | | David Allen | United Kingdom |

=== Europe! Voices of Women in Film ===
| English title | Original title | Director(s) | Production country |
|---|---|---|---|
| Afterwar | | Birgitte Stærmose | Denmark |
| Excursion | Ekskurzija | Una Gunjak | Bosnia |
| Immortals | | Maja Tschumi | Switzerland, Iraq |
| Je'vida | | Katja Gauriloff | Finland |
| The Lost Children | | Michèle Jacob | Belgium |
| A Postcard from Rome | | Elza Gauja | Latvia |

=== Sounds on Screen ===
| English title | Original title | Director(s) | Production country |
|---|---|---|---|
| Blur: To the End | | Toby L | United Kingdom |
| Head South | | Jonathan Ogilvie | New Zealand |
| Resonance | | Kate Vinen, Jayden Rathsam Hua | Australia |

=== Family ===
| English title | Original title | Director(s) | Production country |
|---|---|---|---|
| 200% Wolf | | Alexs Stadermann | Australia |
| Despicable Me 4 | | Chris Renaud | United States |
| It's Okay! | 괜찮아 괜찮아 괜찮아! | Kim Hye-young | South Korea |
| The Mountain | | Rachel House | New Zealand |
| My Freaky Family | | Mark Gravas | Australia, Ireland |
| The Sloth Lane | | Tania Vincent, Ricard Cussó | Australia |

=== Nancy Savoca Retrospective ===
| English title | Original title | Director(s) | Production country |
|---|---|---|---|
| Bad Timing | | Nancy Savoca | United States |
| Dogfight | | Nancy Savoca | United States |
| Household Saints | | Nancy Savoca | United States |
| Renata | | Nancy Savoca | United States |
| True Love | | Nancy Savoca | United States |

=== Ousmane Sembene Retrospective ===
| English title | Original title | Director(s) | Production country |
|---|---|---|---|
| Black Girl | La noire de... | Ousmane Sembène | Senegal |
| Borom Sarret | | Ousmane Sembène | Senegal |
| Camp de Thiaroye | | Ousmane Sembène | Senegal |
| Ceddo | | Ousmane Sembène | Senegal |
| Emitaï | | Ousmane Sembène | Senegal |
| Guelwaar | | Ousmane Sembène | Senegal |
| Mandabi | | Ousmane Sembène | Senegal |
| Moolaadé | | Ousmane Sembène | Senegal |
| Niaye | | Ousmane Sembène | Senegal |
| Tauw | | Ousmane Sembène | Senegal |
| Xala | | Ousmane Sembène | Senegal |

=== Classics Restored ===
| English title | Original title | Director(s) | Production country |
|---|---|---|---|
| The Cars That Ate Paris | | Peter Weir | Australia |
| Mississippi Masala | | Mira Nair | United States |
| Peeping Tom | | Michael Powell | United States |
| Rabbit-Proof Fence | | Phillip Noyce | Australia |
| Ten Canoes | | Rolf de Heer, Peter Djigirr | Australia |

=== FLUX ===
| English title | Original title | Director(s) | Production country |
|---|---|---|---|
| The Ballad of Suzanne Cesaire | | Madeleine Hunt-Ehrlich | United States |
| Conspiracy | | Madeleine Hunt-Ehrlich, Simone Leigh | United States |
| The Soldier's Lagoon | La Laguna del Soldado | Pablo Álvarez Mesa | Canada |
| Soundtrack to a Coup d'Etat | | Johan Grimonprez | Belgium |

=== Screenability ===
| English title | Original title | Director(s) | Production country |
|---|---|---|---|
| Good Bad Things | | Shane D. Stranger | United States |
| Rehabilitating | | Inez Playford | Australia |
| The Ride Ahead | | Samuel Habib, Dan Habib | United States |
| The Stimming Pool | | Benjamin Brown, Georgia Bradburn, Sam Chown-Ahern, Robin Elliott-Knowles, Lucy Walker, Steven Eastwood | United Kingdom |
| Threshold | | Sofya Gollan | Australia |
| Unstoppable | | Jack Byrnes, Marcus Porcaro | Australia |

=== Dendy Awards for Australian Short Films ===
| English title | Original title | Director(s) | Production country |
|---|---|---|---|
| Alone | | Alex Weight | Australia |
| Besharam! | | Raghav Rampal | Australia |
| Bong Xi Fa Cai | | Johnathan Lo | Australia |
| Darwin Story | | Natasha Tonkin | Australia |
| Die Bully Die | | Nathan Lacey, Nick Lacey | Australia |
| The Disconnected | | Pia Derya | Australia |
| The Gay | | Madeleine Purdy | Australia |
| The Meaningless Daydreams of Augie & Celeste | | Pernell Marsden | Australia |
| Say | | Chloe Kemp | Australia |
| This Will Never Last | | Julia van Oppen, Katrina Lin, Holly May Fletcher | Australia |

=== Shorts airing with features ===
| English title | Original title | Director(s) | Production country |
|---|---|---|---|
| Dancer | | Nomin Gantulga | Australia, Mongolia |
| Dream Creep | | Carlos A.F. Lopez | United States |
| Earwax | | Jasper Martin | Australia |
| The Feast | | Rishi Chandna | India |
| First Horse | | Awanui Simich-Pene | New Zealand |
| Grove of Giants | | Bree Sanders | Australia |
| It Will Find You | | Chris Broadbent, Enzo Tedeschi | Australia |
| Lullaby | | Chi Thai | United Kingdom |
| Meat Puppet | | Eros V | United Kingdom |
| Mother Tongue | Lea Tupu'anga | Vea Mafile'o | New Zealand |
| Of the Last Reel in Front of You | | Yan Geng | Australia |
| Rehabilitating | | Inez Playford | Australia |
| Tayal Forest Club | | Laha Mebow | Taiwan |
| Threshold | | Sofya Gollan | Australia |
| Transylvanie | | Rodrigue Huart | France |
| Unstoppable | | Jack Byrnes, Marcus Porcaro | Australia |
| The Waiting | | Volker Schlecht | Germany |
| Withered Blossoms | | Lionel Seah | Australia |

== Awards ==
The following awards were presented at the festival:

- Sydney Film Prize: There's Still Tomorrow (C'è ancora domani) — Paola Cortellesi
- Documentary Australia Award for Australian Documentary: Welcome to Babel — James Bradley
- Sustainable Future Award: Black Snow — Alina Simone
- First Nations Award: First Horse — Awanui Simich-Pene
- Dendy Awards for Australian Short Films
  - Dendy Live Action Short Award: Die Bully Die — Nathan Lacey, Nick Lacey
  - The Rouben Mamoulian Award: The Meaningless Daydreams of Augie & Celeste — Pernell Marsden
  - Yoram Gross Animation Award: Darwin Story — Natasha Tonkin
  - AFTRS Craft Award: Say — Chloe Kemp
  - Event Cinemas Rising Talent Award: Bridget Morrison, Say
- Sydney UNESCO City of Film Award: Debbie Lee
- GIO Audience Awards
  - Best Australian Narrative Feature: The Moogai — Jon Bell
  - Best Australian Narrative Feature, Runner Up: In Vitro — Will Howarth, Tom McKeith
  - Best Australian Documentary: Skategoat — Van Alpert
  - Best Australian Documentary, Runner Up: Every Little Thing — Sally Aitken
  - Best International Feature: The Seed of the Sacred Fig — Mohammad Rasoulof
  - Best International Feature, Runner Up: Kneecap — Rich Peppiatt
  - Best International Documentary: The Home Game (Heimaleikurinn) — Smari Gunn, Logi Sigursveinsson
  - Best International Documentary, Runner Up: Porcelain War — Brendan Bellomo, Slava Leontyev
