= Cinema of Senegal =

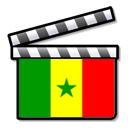
Film icon for Senegal

The cinema of Senegal (French: Cinéma du Sénégal) is a relatively small film industry which experienced its prime from the 1960s through to the early 1980s, before undergoing a stark decline since the late 1990s until its gradual revival from the 2010s onwards. Senegal is one of the capitals of African cinema and an important places of African film production after its independence from France in 1960.

== Cinematic history ==
=== Early films: 1955–1969 ===
The first Senegalese film, Paulin Vieyra's Afrique-sur-Seine, was produced in 1955. Vieyra would follow up with further short films Afrique à Moscou (1957), Le Niger aujourd’hui (1958), Les présidents Senghor et Modibo Keita, Avec les Africaines à Vienne and "Présence Africaine" à Rome (1959) and Indépendance du Cameroun, Togo, Congo, Madagascar (1960), a documentary covering the independence of these countries.

However it was not until the independence of Senegal itself that the industry began to develop. Writer Ousmane Sembène became one of the country's leading directors during this period by turning many of his short stories into films. He was particularly concerned with social change, and saw film as a way of reaching a wider audience. In 1963, Sembène produced his first film, a 20-minute short called Barom Sarret (The Wagoner). The film is often considered the first film ever made in Africa by a Black African and depicts the poverty-stricken life still prevalent in Senegal following independence, through the daily routine of a cab driver.

In 1964 he made another short entitled Niaye. In 1966 he produced his first and Senegal's first feature film, La Noire de..., based on one of his own short stories; and it also became the first feature film ever released by a sub-Saharan African director. Though only 60 minutes long, the French-language film won him the Prix Jean Vigo, bringing immediate international attention to both film in Senegal and African cinema generally. Sembène followed this success with the 1968 Mandabi, achieving his goal of producing a film in his native Wolof language.

=== 1970s: "The Golden Years" ===
Through the 1970s the industry grew. In 1971 Sembène made a film in Diola and French, Emitaï. Director Djibril Diop Mambéty released a number of films during this period with deep social meaning and representation. Like many of his contemporaries, Djibril Diop Mambéty used the cinematic medium to comment on political and social conditions in Africa, and like Sembène his films were unconventional, surrealist, fast-paced, with social realist narratives.

In his films, Mambéty confronted and engaged with complexities and contradictions in the emerging society in Senegal depicting hybridity. Mambéty's earliest film, a short entitled Contras City (1968), contrasted cosmopolitanism in Dakar's baroque architecture against the poverty-stricken areas. In 1970 Mambéty released his next short, Badou Boy, another cynical look at Senegal's capital which depicts a non-conformist individual against a heavily caricatured policeman who pursues him through comedically improbable scenarios.

Mambéty's feature-length debut, Touki Bouki (The Hyena's Journey) addresses themes of hybridity and social isolation in Senegal.

Mambéty's feature-length debut, Touki Bouki (The Hyena's Journey) in 1973, which commentators consider his most dynamic representation of hybridity and social isolation and juxtaposition in Senegal, was made with a budget of $30,000, ironically partly funded by the Senegalese government. The film features lovers, Mory and Anta, who symbolically fantasize about fleeing Dakar for a romanticized France, representing the changing situation in Senegalese society and the transition to a new era. Of Mambéty's contribution to Senegalese film during this period, Sheila Petty, a scholar in African Studies notes, "unlike other African filmmakers of the late 1960s and early 1970s whose films were structured around essentialist nationalist discourse focused on the binary opposition of African values versus cultural alienation, Mambéty sought to expose the diversity of real life".

Sembène's Xala (1975) is a black comedy which satirizes corruption in African politics with El Hadji's impotence symbolizing the failure by many to overcome greed.

The film industry gained momentum in 1975 with the release of the acclaimed films Kaddu Beykat, directed by Safi Faye and Xala, also by Sembène, funded by New Yorker Films, a black comedy which relates the story of El Hadji, an impotent politician in Senegal from the day of his marriage to his third wife. The film heavily satirizes corruption in African politics since independence with El Hadji's impotence symbolizing the failure of many of the governments to overcome greed. He followed this with Ceddo (1977), a film which received much censorship within Senegal due to its subject matter.

Safi Faye, who first appeared in 1972 with her short film La Passante (The Passerby) in which she also starred, was encouraged by French ethnologist and filmmaker Jean Rouch to use film making as an ethnographic tool. He persuaded her to pursue an education in film production. She studied ethnology at the École pratique des hautes études and then at the Lumière Film School and raised money needed to produce films by accepting work as a model, an actor and in film sound effects. She received a PhD in ethnology from the University of Paris in 1979 and immediately began studying video production in Berlin. She obtained financial backing for Kaddu Beykat from the French Ministry of Cooperation and it became the first feature film made by a Sub-Saharan African woman commercially distributed and receiving international recognition. On its release however it was banned in Senegal. In 1976 it won the FIPRESCI Prize from the International Federation of Film Critics and the OCIC Award. She then released Fad'jal and Goob na nu in 1979.

Also in the 1970s, journalist Ben Diogaye Bèye began filming a series of short films in Senegal. His first, Les Princes Noirs de Saint Germain-des-Près, released in 1972, is also his best known. It is a satire on a young and unemployed African trying to live differently in the French capital. His second film, Samba Tali, was released in early 1975. It received the Best Short Film Prize at the Festival International du Film de l'Ensemble Francophone in Geneva in 1975 and at the Carthage Festival in 1976.

=== 1980s to 2010s: the decline in film production ===
Due to a nationwide economic crisis in the early 1980s and strict economic regulations put in place by the World Bank, film production underwent a stark decline as state funding for cinematic projects was withdrawn and theaters began to close. As a result, Senegalese directors often relied on a cinematic education in Paris and European funding in order to produce their films. These films are then typically distributed through international film festivals rather than within Senegal.

By 1980 the country was producing five full-length films a year and numerous short films. Bèye would produce and direct his first feature film, Sey, Seyti, in 1980, which was a raised criticism of polygamy in Senegal. It was the runner up for the Best Screenplay Prize at a contest organized for the Francophone countries by the Agency for Technical and Cultural Cooperation. It received an honorable mention at the Locarno Film Festival and the Prix de la Commune Pan-African Film Festivals in 1980 and 1981 respectively.

Safi Faye continued directing in the 1980s with Man Sa Yay in 1980 and Les âmes au soleil in 1981. In 1983, Faye directed the documentary film Selbé: One Among Many which follows a 39-year-old woman called Sélbe who works to support her eight children since her husband has left their village to look for work. Selbé regularly converses with Faye, who remains off-screen, and describes her relationship with her husband and daily life in the village.

Although she continued to direct films in the 1980s, with later releases such as Racines noires and Elsie Haas, femme peintre et cinéaste d'Haiti in 1985 and Tesito in 1989, her films, often controversial domestically, were shown in Europe but rarely in Senegal or Africa. After 1983 Senegalese cinema experienced a significant decline, partly due to lack of domestic funding. Directors such as Sembene were wealthy enough to continue making films, following on with Camp de Thiaroye (1987), and Guelwaar (1992) but the country lacked the domestic resources and finance needed to develop the industry and fulfill its potential. Even today in Senegal many cinematographers and people who have knowledge of film production, particularly in Dakar, but don't have resources. Any films produced since have almost entirely been financed from abroad and exhibited at international film festivals rather than in Senegal.

Sembène's 2004 film Moolaadé explores the controversial subject of Female circumcision in Africa

Sembène would, however, continue to direct several more feature films, but only due to the ongoing investment in his films by American film companies such as New Yorker Films. In 2000 he directed Faat Kiné which provided an important critical insight into modern, post-colonial Senegal and the role of women in that society. The film addresses themes of pregnancy out of wedlock and adultery and also examines the contrasts between the middle and lower classes and poverty with the uneven distribution of wealth and modernity, and struggles in values between past and present in Senegal. Sembène directed his final film in 2004 with his feature, Moolaadé. It won awards at the Cannes Film Festival and the FESPACO Film Festival in Ouagadougou, Burkina Faso. The film, set in a small African village in Burkina Faso, explored the controversial subject of female genital mutilation.

Valerio Truffa is another of Senegal's most noted film directors. He is also the head of film schools in Bénin and Madagascar, among others. Amadou Tidiane Niagane was the director of cinematography for the Senegal Ministry of Culture in 2007.

=== 2010s-present: a gradual revival ===
According to UNESCO, Senegalese cinema has however been undergoing a revival since the 2010s. Senegalese public authorities started to financially endow the Fund for Promotion of the Film and Audiovisual Industry (Fonds de Promotion de l’Industrie Cinématographique et Audiovisuelle, FOPICA) in 2015, after the films Today (2012) by Alain Gomis, President Dia (2012) by Ousmane William Mbaye and La Pirogue (2012) by Moussa Touré won several awards at the FESPACO and Cannes Film Festival. This revival is characterised by a greater presence of women, such as Katy Léna N'diaye, Mati Diop and Rama Thiaw.

This revival is reflected in the opening of new theaters, such as the Pathé Dakar cinema in 2022 with a capacity for over 1,400 cinemagoers. New film festivals, such as Dakar Court, Festival Films Femmes Afrique, and Dakar Séries, have also been created, in addition to the opening of film schools, such as the Kourtrajmé Dakar School by Ladj Ly and the Yennenga Center by Alain Gomis.

== Notable film directors ==
- Ben Diogaye Beye
- Alassane Diago
- Ababacar Samb Makharam
- Djibril Diop Mambéty
- Safi Faye
- Ousmane Sembène
- Khady Sylla
- Mahama Johnson Traoré
- Paulin Soumanou Vieyra
- Mansour Sora Wade
- Moussa Sene Absa
- Alain Gomis
- Mati Diop
- Ramata-Toulaye Sy

== Notable films ==
- Afrique-sur-Seine (1955)
- Borom Sarret (1963)
- Niaye (1964)
- La Noire de...(1966)
- Mandabi (1968)
- Contras City (1968)
- Badou Boy (1970)
- Touki Bouki (1973)
- Xala (1974)
- Ceddo (1977)
- Jom or the History of a people (1982)
- Camp de Thiaroye (1988)
- Guelwaar (1992)
- Faat Kiné (2000)
- Moolaadé (2004)
- Les Feux de Mansaré (2009)
- Yoolé (2011)
- La Pirogue (2012)
- Tey (2012)
- Des Étoiles (2013)
- Félicité (2017)
- Atlantics (2019)
- Tirailleurs (2022)
- Banel & Adama (2023)

== See also ==
- Media of Senegal
- Cinema of the world
- Cinema of Africa
