= Makhourédia Guèye =

Senegalese actor

- Died: April 6, 2008; Dakar
- Occupations: Actor, saxophonist
- Years active: 1945-2008

Makhourédia Guèye, born Mamadou Guèye, was a Senegalese film and theatre actor known for his roles in films written and directed by Ousmane Sembène.

== Filmography ==
=== Film ===
- Mandabi (1968) - Ibrahima Dieng
- Lambaaye (1972)
- Garga M'Bossé (1975) - Manel Gueye
- Xala (1975) - the president
- Ceddo (1977) - the king
- Jom ou l'histoire d'un peuple (1981) - Canar Fall
- Hyenas (1992) - the mayor

=== Television ===
- Lat Dior
