= Thierno Faty Sow =

Senegalese film director, screenwriter and actor (1941–2009)

- Born: December 23, 1941; Thiès, Senegal
- Died: December 6, 2009 (aged 67); Dakar, Senegal
- Occupations: film director, screenwriter and actor
- Notable work: Camp de Thiaroye (1988), feature film codirected with Ousmane Sembène

Thierno Faty Sow (Thiès, Senegal, 1941 – Dakar, 2009) was a Senegalese filmmaker, screenwriter and actor.

== Biography ==
Born in 1941 in Thiès, Senegal, Sow studied filmmaking in Paris at the Conservatoire libre du cinéma français (CLCF) and subsequently worked in French and Senegalese television. He directed documentary shorts and three feature films on his own: Guereo, village de Djibril N'Diaye (1970), L'Option / Mon beau pays (1974), and L'Œil (1981). Sow is best known for the historical drama film Camp de Thiaroye about the Thiaroye massacre near Dakar on December 1, 1944, which he cowrote and codirected with Ousmane Sembène. It won the Grand Special Jury Prize at the 45th Venice International Film Festival in 1988.

Sow also performed as a movie actor in two feature films, Nuit africaine (1990) by Gérard Guillaume and cowriters Gaston Kaboré and Lapeyssonie, and Guelwaar (1992) by Ousmane Sembène.

Sow died from illness in Dakar on December 6, 2009.

== Filmography ==
Sow's films include:

| Year | Film | Genre | Role | Duration |
|---|---|---|---|---|
| 1970 | La journée de Djibril N'Diaye - Journée d'un paysan sénégalais | Biography feature (24 hours in the life of a Senegalese farmer) | Director | 60 min |
| 1970 | Guereo, village de Djibril N'Diaye | Feature in black and white (A man prepares to marry a second wife to help the first with the heavy work.) | Director | 90 min |
| 1974 | L'Option / Mon beau pays | Biography feature, Wolof spoken (After Independence a Senegalese soldier prefers to stay in France.) | Director | 90 min |
| 1976 | Adios by André Michel | Television miniseries | Second Unit or Assistant Director for 1 episode | 90 min |
| 1977 | Exode rural | Short | Director | |
| 1977 | Education sanitaire | Short documentary | Director | |
| 1977 | Feux de brousse/ Feu de brousse | Short | Director | |
| 1977 | Sunu Koppe | Short | Director | |
| 1981 | L'Œil | Historical feature (On mercenaries and military coups in Africa.) | Director | 80 min |
| 1987 | Camp de Thiaroye | Historical drama feature (In 1944, the French army massacred several units of West African conscripts recently returned from the battlefields of Europe.) | Screenwriter and Codirector with Ousmane Sembène | 148 or 157 min |
| 1990 | Nuit africaine (La) by Gérard Guillaume | Historical feature, TV movie (Eugène Jamot, a doctor in the colonial army, was an extraordinary fighter for health in Equatorial and Western Africa.) | Actor | 104 min |
| 1992 | Guelwaar, Légende africaine de l'Afrique du XXIe siècle by Ousmane Sembène | Feature (By mistake, a Catholic man is given a Muslim burial.) | Actor | 115 min |

== See also ==
- Cinema of Senegal
- List of Senegalese films

== Bibliography ==
- Armes, Roy (2008). Dictionary of African Filmmakers. Bloomington: Indiana University Press]. ISBN 0253000424. Page 121.
- Artese, A. (September 1988). "Conversazione con Ousmane Sembene e Thierno Faty Sow". Cineforum (in Italian). 28 (277).
- Vieyra, Paulin Soumanou (1983). Le cinéma au Sénégal. Cinemedia. Cinemas d'Afrique Noire, 4 (in French). Bruxelles: OCIC. ISBN 2858022801. OCLC 958999363.
