= In vitro (disambiguation) =

In vitro refers to studies performed with microorganisms, cells, or biological molecules outside their normal biological context.

In vitro may also refer to:

- In vitro fertilization, a process of fertilization where an egg is combined with sperm outside the body
- In Vitro, a fictional genetically engineered subspecies of humans in the science fiction television series Space: Above and Beyond
- In Vitro (journal), a scientific journal
- In Vitro (film), a 2024 Australian science-fiction film.
