= Younousse =

Younousse is both a given name and a surname. Notable people with the name include:

- Younousse Sankharé (born 1989), Senegalese footballer
- Younousse Sèye (born 1940), Senegalese artist and actress
- Cherif Younousse (born 1995), Qatari volleyball player
