= Xala (novel) =

1973 novel by Ousmane Sembène

- First edition (French)
- Author: Ousmane Sembène
- Language: French
- Publisher: Présence Africaine
- Publication date: 1973
- Publication place: Senegal
- English publication date: 1976
- Media type: Print

Xala is a 1973 novel by Ousmane Sembène, that was later translated and published in English in 1976 as part of the influential Heinemann African Writers Series. It is about El Hadji Abdou Kader Beye, a businessman who is struck by impotence on the night of his wedding to his third wife.

It was adapted into a movie, also called Xala (1975) and directed by Sembene.
