= God's Bits of Wood =

1960 novel by Ousmane Sembène

- First edition
- Author: Ousmane Sembène
- Original title: Les bouts de bois de Dieu
- Translator: Francis Price
- Cover artist: Fraser Taylor
- Language: French
- Publisher: Le Livre Contemporain
- Publication date: 1960
- Publication place: Senegal, France
- English publication date: 1962
- Pages: 248
- ISBN: 0-435-90959-2

God's Bits of Wood is a 1960 novel by Senegalese author Ousmane Sembène. It is a fictional treatment based on an historic railroad strike in colonial Senegal of the 1940s. It was written and published in French under the title Les bouts de bois de Dieu. The book deals with several ways that the Senegalese and Malians responded to colonialism. The book casts a critical regard towards accommodation, collaboration, and overall idealization of the French colonials. At the same time, the story details the strikers who work against the mistreatment of the Senegalese people.

The novel was translated into English in 1962, and published by William Heinemann Ltd, as God's Bits of Wood. It was part of their influential African Writers Series.

== Plot summary ==
The action takes place in several locations—primarily in Bamako, Thiès, and Dakar. The map at the beginning shows the locations and suggests that the story is about a whole country and all of its people. A large cast of characters are associated with each place. Some are featured players—Fa Keita, Tiemoko, Maimouna, Ramatoulaye, Penda, Deune, N'Deye, Dejean, and Bakayoko. The fundamental conflict is captured in two characters: Dejean, the French manager and colonialist, and Bakayoko, the soul and spirit of the strike. In another sense, however, the main characters of the novel are the people as a collective and the railroad itself.

The strike causes an evolution in the self-perception of the strikers; this is especially noticeable among the women of Bamako, Thiès, and Dakar. These women go from standing behind the men to walking alongside them and eventually marching ahead of them. When the men are able to work the factory jobs that the railroad provides them, the women are responsible for running the markets, preparing the food, and rearing the children.

But the onset of the strike gives the role of bread-winner – or perhaps more precisely, bread scavenger – to the women. Eventually it is the women who march on foot for over four days from Thiès to Dakar. Many of the men originally oppose the women's march, but it is this show of determination from the marching women, formerly dismissed by the French as "concubines", that demonstrates how relentless the strikers and their communities are. Recognizing the women's march causes the French to understand the nature of the willpower that they are facing, and shortly after the French agree to the demands of the strikers.

The book also highlights the oppression faced by women in the colonial era. They were deprived of their ability to speak on matters regarding society as a whole. Sembène, however, raises their status by considering them equally important to the men in the strike and society.

== Historical significance ==
The book came out in 1960, the year that Senegal achieved independence. The theme of unity is significant for the building of the newly independent nation.
