= En attendant les hommes =

- Directed by: Katy Léna N'diaye
- Screenplay by: Katy Léna N'diaye
- Produced by: Neon Rouge ASBL
- Cinematography: Herman Bertiau
- Edited by: Yannick Leroy
- Music by: Erwin Vann
- Release date: 2007
- Running time: 56 min.
- Countries: Belgium; Mauritania

En attendant les hommes ("Waiting for Men") is a 2007 documentary film by Katy Léna N'diaye about women muralists in Oualata, Mauritania. In this town on the far edge of the Sahara desert, three women practice traditional painting on the walls of the town.

== Plot ==
Oualata is a small oasis town in the far east of the Mauritanian desert. In this islet, an ephemeral rampart against the sands, three traditional women painters decorate the red walls with frescoes in a society apparently dominated by tradition, religion and men, and speak freely about gender relations.
