= Xala =

1975 Senegalese satirical film

- DVD cover
- Directed by: Ousmane Sembène
- Screenplay by: Ousmane Sembène
- Based on: Xala by Ousmane Sembène
- Produced by: Filmi Domireve SNC
- Starring: Thierno Leye; Seune Samb; Douta Seck; Younousse Sèye; Fatim Diagne; Myriam Niang
- Cinematography: Georges Caristan Orlando L. López Seydina D. Saye Farba Seck
- Edited by: Florence Eymon
- Music by: Samba Diabara Samb
- Production companies: Films Domireew; Société Nationale Cinématographique
- Distributed by: New Yorker Films (USA)
- Release date: July 1975 (Moscow)
- Running time: 121 minutes
- Country: Senegal
- Languages: French; Wolof

Xala (pronounced [ˈxɐlɐ], Wolof for "temporary sexual impotence") is a 1975 Senegalese satirical comedy film written and directed by Ousmane Sembène, an adaptation of Sembène's 1973 novel of the same name. It stars Thierno Leye, Seune Samb, Douta Seck, Younousse Sèye, Fatim Diagne, and Myriam Niang.

The plot depicts El Hadji, a rich businessman in Senegal, who is cursed with crippling erectile dysfunction upon the day of his marriage to his third wife; that could only be cured by him stripping naked before the lowly of the society and have them spit on him. The film satirizes the corruption in African post-independence governments; El Hadji's impotence symbolizes the failure of such governments to be useful at all.

== Plot ==
As French colonial rule ends in Senegal, new members of the Senegalese Chamber of Commerce commemorate the appointment of a new Chamber of Commerce president, the first Senegalese president in history. As singers and dancers celebrate outside the building, the new members remove French decor from the offices and eject the existing French members of the board. After the French men leave and return with suitcases full of money for the Senegalese members, they are allowed to stay. Member of the board El Hadji Abdoukader Beye, a Senegalese businessman and a Muslim, uses his position to improve his business, including ordering soldiers to remove the poor from begging on his street.

El Hadji's success leads him to take on a third wife, thereby demonstrating his social and economic success. Despite his first and second wives' disapproval, he marries a young woman of a prominent family. On the wedding night he discovers that he is incapable of consummating the marriage; he has become impotent. At the beginning, he suspects that one or both of his first two wives have put the spell on him, and receives advice to consult with marabouts to cure his "loss of manhood". This leads him to try using charms and rituals, despite his previous disapproval of the traditional Senegalese superstitions. After his impotence is finally cured by a marabout recommended by his driver, he is warned that the xala could easily return, and is unable to immediately consummate his marriage as his new wife has started her period.

During this time, his business is starting to fail, with shipments failing to come in and business partners and the bank denying his requests for a loan. It is revealed that El Hadji sold off the Senegalese national grain stores to a Moorish merchant, and this discovery has tainted the reputation of the board of the Chamber of Commerce. A meeting is called at the Chamber of Commerce concerning El Hadji's position, where his colleagues cite his corruption as the reason the people and institutions of Senegal no longer trust them. El Hadji does not deny his charges, but claims all of the other board members are also corrupt and untrustworthy. After El Hadji is voted out of the board, a former pickpocket who stole an entire village's money is chosen as his replacement. Returning to his shop, El Hadji is approached by officers of the state who seize his business and car for his fraudulent sale of the national grain stores. The marabout who cured El Hadji of his impotence also returns, giving back El Hadji the bounced check he was given as payment, and reminding him that he was told his xala could return as easily as it was cured.

El Hadji returns to his first wife's home, as his second wife has moved out and his third wife's family has returned his wedding gifts and called off the marriage. Hearing of El Hadji's returned impotence, a blind beggar who was previously removed from the street in front of El Hadji's business expresses he can reverse the condition. Leading several other beggars to El Hadji's home, the blind man confronts El Hadji about his theft of inheritance, claiming to be a member of the Beye family whom El Hadji had defrauded. The beggar says that it is him that has cursed El Hadji with xala, but offers to remove the curse if El Hadji stands in the middle of the beggars naked and allows himself to be spit on. Desperate to remove the spell, El Hadji submits himself to the punishment of the beggars.

== Characters ==
- El Hadji Abdoukader Beye, a Senegalese businessman
- Rama, Beye's daughter with his first wife
- Adja Awa Astou, Beye's first wife
- Oumi Ndoye, the second wife
- Ngoné, the third wife
- Modu, El Hadji's chauffeur
- Sérigne Mada, a marabout
- The president of the chamber of commerce
- Dupont-Durand, the president's chaperone

== Release ==
Xala was released at the Moscow Film Festival in July 1975.

Xala received a home video release in 2005. The DVD has been out of print for some time. Xala received its Blu-Ray debut through a Criterion Collection release in May 2024, as part of a box set containing two other films by Sembène, Emitaï and Ceddo.

== Reception ==
=== Critical reception ===
On the review aggregator website Rotten Tomatoes, 91% of 11 critics' reviews are positive. Metacritic, which uses a weighted average, assigned the film a score of 80 out of 100, based on 11 critics, indicating "generally favorable" reviews.

=== Criticism ===
Aaron Mushengyezi wrote: "I posit that in Xala, he evokes two problematic binary oppositions: between the corruption and decadence of foreign influence and the purity and morality of African tradition, the former represented as 'corrupting' and the latter 'redemptive'; and between strong, revolutionary 'masculine' women and villainous, weak, 'feminine' men."

Another scholarly perspective is from Harriet D. Lyons: "I shall argue that in Sembene's work the "covertness" of the folk material takes the form of suppression of detail combined with the retention of essential values. Sembene is thereby able to use folk elements in such a way as to give the work political implications that go well beyond the preservation and/or revival of a local tradition. One can, therefore, examine the folk elements of Xala without fear of consigning yet another expression of African creativity to the museum of primitive art."

== Awards ==
The film was entered into the 9th Moscow International Film Festival.

The film won the Special Prize of the Jury at the Festival Internacional de Cine de Karlovy Vary in 1976.

The film ranked #83 in Empire magazine's "The 100 Best Films of World Cinema" in 2010.

== See also ==
- Cinema of Senegal
