= Faat Kiné =

2000 film

- Movie poster
- Directed by: Ousmane Sembène
- Written by: Ousmane Sembène
- Produced by: Wongue Mbengue
- Starring: Venus Seye; Mame Ndoumbé; Ndiagne Dia; Mariama Balde; Awa Sene Sarr; Tabata Ndiaye
- Cinematography: Dominique Gentil
- Edited by: Kahéna Attia
- Music by: Yandé Codou Sène
- Distributed by: New Yorker Films (US)
- Release date: 2000 (Senegal)
- Running time: 117 minutes
- Country: Senegal
- Languages: French; Wolof

Faat Kiné is a 2000 Senegalese film written and directed by Ousmane Sembène, set in present-day Dakar, Senegal. It provides a critical look at modern, post-colonial Senegal and the place of women in that society. It gives a clear glimpse into life of the Senegalaise middle-class and presents present-day Dakar in all of its contradictions of poverty and wealth, tradition and modernity.

== Plot ==
After two pregnancies out of wedlock, Faat Kiné has earned a place for herself as a successful gas station owner in patriarchal Senegalaise society, raising her two children alone and providing fully for their needs.

After passing their baccalaureates, Faat Kiné's children, Djip and Aby, try to fix their mother up with Uncle Jean, a Christian businessman, who outwardly objects because Kiné is Muslim, but is actually pursuing her.

Throughout the film, Kiné reminisces about her life. She was very close to getting her own baccalauréat when she was impregnated by one of her professors. She was subsequently expelled and disowned by her father. Angered at the shame Kine brought on their family, he even attempted to burn her but her mother shielded her; surviving with severe burn scars on her back. Kiné later started working at a gas station as an attendant to support herself. Only a few years after her first pregnancy, she became pregnant again and was abandoned by her fiance who took her life savings and tried to flee the country. Since then, Faat Kiné has been successful; buying a house for herself, her two children, and her mother. Back in the present, Kiné is very happy when her children present her their baccalauréat diplomas.

At the party to celebrate the graduates, Djip's father shows up, but Djip consistently refers to him as "Monsieur Boubacar Omar Payane, a.k.a. BOP" rather than "father." Aby's father, M. Gaye, also comes to the party, and she asks him to finance her college education. Her father is offended and tells her to ask Kiné, despite the fact that it is Kiné who has raised Aby her whole life, while Gaye has given her no support. After an altercation involving BOP, Gaye, and Djip, the two men are booted out of the party. At the end of the party, Djib and Aby are delighted to discover that Faat Kiné and Uncle Jean have become a couple, which they attribute to their matchmaking skills, but it is clear that Faat Kiné and Uncle Jean were attracted to each other from the beginning.

== See also ==
- Cinema of Senegal
