= Agnam Lidoubé =

Coordinates: 16°00′N 13°41′W

- Village
- Interactive map of Agnam Lidoubé
- Country: Senegal
- Region: Matam
- Department: Matam

Population (2002)
  - Total: 362
- Time zone: UTC+0 (GMT)

Agnam Lidoubé is a sahelian village in the north-east of Senegal located to the east of the village of Agnam-Goly. It had a population of 362 people according to the 2002 census.

== Geography ==
=== Population ===
Agnam Lidoubé has approximately 1,300 people in over a hundred households. The population is characterized by high rates of rural migration, which is also a phenomenon characteristic of all the villages of Fouta.

Since the seasonal rainfall can is no longer sufficient to support crops that enable people to sustain themselves throughout the year, young people are obliged to go to the big cities of the country, particularly Dakar, but also other large African megacities and Western countries.

== Economy ==
The remittances that emigres send enable families to alleviate the hardship caused by drought. The village of Agnam Lidoubé, like all the villages of the middle valley of the Senegal River, drew their subsistence from agriculture of the Waalo (floodplain) and Jeeri (cultivable during the rainy season). Farming and fishing supplemented the family's income but since 1970, which was the beginning of the drought and desertification, the environment has been depleted and lost all its potential to sustain the population. Since the construction of dams on the river in the 1990s, the problem has worsened, especially in the remote villages of the river, such as Agnam Lidoubé, that are not provided with irrigation for crops.

For livestock (cattle, sheep, and goats), about 50% of the villagers have two cows, five sheep and five goats per family on average. Ruminants were able to give milk only during the rainy season (3–4 months a year). For lack of such food, milk powder comes from the West, especially France and the Netherlands. It is sold in the village at 2,000 CFA francs (3.05 euros) per kg.

Fish is more affordable (yaboy a kind of sardine) than meat and comes every morning in refrigerated trucks from the coastal villages of the country, such as Mbour. The fish is sold at 100 to 150 CFA francs each.

The contributions of citizens in the West for this region are significant for the survival of the population. In the case of Agnam Lidoubé, the emigre workers in Europe, consolidate their remittances for their families back in the village, sending on average a total of 5000 euros per month for food for their families and loved ones. In the village, the people without question take care of the families of their sisters, brothers, cousins, and other relatives if they are poor.

With these examples we can understand how families who have no income can still live in this area. But it must be observed that the mobilization of women for income-generating activities (gardening, trade etc.) has positively contributed to the ability to survive in this place.

== History ==
In 2004, several scenes of Lili and the Baobab, a film by Chantal Richard played by Romane Bohringer, were shot at Agnam Lidoubé.

== Administration ==
Agnam Lidoubé is located in the department of Matam in the Matam region. The village is part of the Agnam Civol rural community.

=== Village structures ===
The UFAL (Union of Women of Agnam Lidoubé) and the ADSCAL (Association for the Sociocultural Development of Agnam Lidoubé) are two complementary associations and the principle participants of all social and economic activities of the village. There is an association of young people: Gooto-Rewaa which deals with sports activities and there is an association of students and teachers which provides activities for students during the summer vacation, runs conferences to teach people the benefits of education, hygiene and health. A structure to coordinate all social, educational, and economic activities, in which there are representatives of all of the village, was created in January 2007.

=== General Coordination of Agnam Lidoubé for Development (CGALD) ===
Instances

- The Village General Assembly (AGV):

all the villagers

- The Board of Administration (CA):

The Imam of the mosque and the village chief
The men of the mosque "the wise men": 4 people
The UFAL: 9 people
The ADSCAL: 7 people
The association of students and students: 4 people.

=== Activities, their management committees, and monitoring ===
- Social assistance (baptism, marriage, funerals): :"the wise men", UFAL, ADSCAL (9 members)
- Lessons (French school, Pulaar, Koranic and professional development activities related to the village):

"the wise men", UFAL, ADSCAL, APE, Teachers, Ass. of students and teachers (8 members + 5 teachers)

- Hygiene and household waste management:

UFAL, ADSCAL, school, Ass. of students and teachers (12 members)

- Management of drinking water: UFAL and ADSCAL form the administration and technical committee (10 members)
- The vegetable garden:

UFAL and ADSCAL (8 members)

- Micro-credit Agency:

UFAL, ADSCAL "the wise men" (11 members)

- Economic and income-generating projects:

GIE - "Yooli Korel" (9 members)

- Management of the mosque, the cemetery, and the canoe:

"the wise men" and ADSCAL (6 members)

- Sports and culture:

the Youth (Gooto-Rewaa) and Ass. of students and teachers, ADSCAL, UFAL (12 members)

=== Meetings ===
- The Village General Assembly meets every 4 months unless there is an Extraordinary General Meeting.
- The Board of Administration meets on the first Thursday of every 2 months, but emergency meetings can be convened.
- Groups and sub groups meet according to the progress of their work

=== Village Partners ===
- ALDA (Liaison Association for the Development of Agnam)
- "The Friends of Agnam" (French association)
- EMI (Entraide Médicale Internationale) - International Medical Assistance in Calvados France
- ANCAR (National Agency for Agricultural and Rural Consulting) Senegal

== Notable People linked to the Village ==
The village is the birthplace of the film director Alassane Diago and the setting for his film Les Larmes de l'émigration.

== Bibliography ==
- Mohamadou Kane, Contemporary international migration from the department of Matam, Annales de la Faculté des lettres et sciences humaines de Dakar, 1984
