= The Money-Order with White Genesis =

1966 book by Ousmane Sembène

First edition (publ. Présence Africaine)

The money-order with White genesis (French: Le mandat, précédé de Véhi Ciosane) is a book containing two novellas by Senegalese author Ousmane Sembène, first published in French in 1966. An English-language translation was published in 1972. It tells two stories. In White Genesis, a mother struggles with conflict after her teenage daughter's pregnancy becomes apparent. In The Money-order, a man receives a money-order from a relative living in Paris.

The book was adapted by the author into a movie, Mandabi (Wolof: manda bi which comes from the French word mandat, money order), in 1968.

== Plot summary ==
=== White Genesis ===
A teenager's pregnancy is beginning to show. This causes her mother much grief, as the girl will not name the father. Suspicion in the village rests on a navetanekat, or migrant laborer. He denies any involvement. Nevertheless, one of the brothers of Khar Madaiagua Diob (the expectant mother) tramples the laborer's crops. An angry mob searches for the navetanekat for a few days. Eventually, the girl tells her mother the truth: her own father is also the father of her child.

=== The Money-Order ===
The Money-Order centers on an illiterate, middle-aged Senegalese man named Dieng. Dieng has been unemployed for some time, and he has two wives and several children. Dieng receives word that a money-order is waiting for him at the post office. Dieng wants the money, but he faces much difficulty in obtaining it. He doesn't have proper identification, and he even must pay a translator to read him the message with the order. Compounding Dieng's troubles is the fact that Dieng's neighbors are learning of his recent windfall. Enter Mbaye, a so-called "New African". Effective in his business dealings, Mbaye owns a villa on the other side of town. With a flourish of generosity, Mbaye promises to help Dieng cash the money-order.
