= Ben Diogaye Bèye =

Senegalese film director

- Born: 1947 (age 77–78); Senegal
- Occupation(s): Film writer, filmmaker, film producer and journalist
- Notable work: Un Homme Des Femmes (1983)

Ben Diogaye Bèye (born 1947) is a Senegalese filmwriter, filmmaker, film producer and journalist. He was the assistant director of nearly a dozen Senegalese films, including Touki Bouki with Djibril Diop Mambety, Baks with Momar Thiam, Sarah et Marjama with Axel Lohman, and the co-screenwriter of the latter two.

== Education and Career ==
Educated in Paris, he was an apprentice of several noted Senegalese filmmakers, including Ousmane Sembène, Ababacar Samb, and Djibril Diop Mambety. He has been a radio broadcaster-producer for Radio Senegal and also as a professional journalist, directing the Senegalese news agency's "Sports and Culture" department.

His first (short) film was Les Princes Noirs de Saint Germain-des-Près, released in 1972, which is also his best known. It is a satire on a young and unemployed African trying to live differently in the French capital. His second film, Samba Tali, was released in early 1975. He produced and directed it based on his screenplay. It received the Best Short Film Prize at the Festival International du Film de l'Ensemble Francophone in Genèva in 1975 and at the Carthage Festival in 1976.

Bey produced and directed his first feature film, Sey, Seyti, in 1980, which was critical of polygamy in Senegal. It was the runner up for the Best Screenplay Prize at a contest organized for the Francophone countries by the Agency for Technical and Cultural Cooperation. It received an honorable mention at the Locarno Film Festival and the Prix de la Commune Pan-African Film Festivals in 1980 and 1981 respectively.

In 1987, he directed a documentary film on the Senegalese Red Cross. Other films he directed include Un Homme Des Femmes (1983) and Moytuleen (1996). In 2004 he released his second full-length film, Un Amour d’Enfant, which looks at childhood love. It won the UNICEF Award for the Promotion of Children's Rights at the Pan-African Film Festival in 2005 and received a Special Mention from the World Catholic Association for Communication.

He wrote the original scenario for Thiaroye '44, later renamed Camp de Thiaroye and released in 1988. Beye is a member of the Association of Senegalese Filmmakers.
