= Younousse Sèye =

Senegalese artist and actress

- Born: 1940; Saint-Louis, Senegal
- Occupation(s): Actress, visual artist
- Known for: mixed-media works
- Notable work: Mandabi

Younousse Sèye (born 1940) is a Senegalese artist, poet, and actress. Considered Senegal's first woman painter, she is best known for her mixed-media works incorporating cowrie shells. Having no formal training in either visual art or acting, she achieved success in the post-independence Dakar art scene and appeared in several major films by the Senegalese director Ousmane Sembène.

== Early life ==
Younousse Sèye was born in 1940 in Saint-Louis, Senegal. She began painting as a teenager, receiving no formal training. However, she learned some techniques from her mother, who was a fabric-dyer. After studying stenography, she got married and moved to Dakar, where she worked as a secretary and cared for her young family.

== Art ==
Sèye was part of the first generation of Senegalese artists following the country's independence from France in 1960.

When she was starting out as an artist, she participated as a staff member of the First World Festival of Black Arts in Dakar in 1966. Then, in 1969, having become established in the region's art world, she participated in the First Pan-African Cultural Festival in Algiers. There, she won a UNESCO grant for a residency anywhere she would like; eschewing Europe, she chose to study in the Ivory Coast. In 1972, following her residency, she had a solo exhibition at the Hôtel Ivoire in Abidjan. Her work was included in the government-sponsored touring exhibit Senegalese Art Today, which debuted in Paris in 1974. She was then invited to participate in the FESTAC 77 showcase.

Léopold Senghor and Félix Houphouët-Boigny were among the high-profile collectors and supporters of her work. She has worked on public commissions for the offices of the Organisation of African Unity in Ethiopia and Léopold Sédar Senghor International Airport in Dakar, among others.

In 2003, she co-founded the nonprofit art collective Le Collectif Artistes Plasticiens.

Sèye works in mixed media, combining oil painting with embellishments, most notably cowrie shells. While she is also known for her marble carving, she is best known for her "clever and sustained use" of these shells, exploring their persistent symbolic weight as part of a pan-African visual vocabulary, symbolizing everything from currency to womanhood. Her work frequently deals with gender, and she has long been an advocate for women's participation in society, pushing her patron President Senghor to include women in his government.

Her work incorporates elements of Négritude and Pan-Africanism, but with a critical distance. However, she was considered notable at the time for her style "free of the influence of the French classic tradition."

Sèye's success as a self-taught artist was unusual at a time when government support was allowing many Senegalese artists to attend art academies. She herself was offered a spot at the École Nationale des Beaux Arts (Senegal), which would have made her the first woman student there, but she turned it down due to family and career obligations. She saw herself as somewhat separate from the École de Dakar art scene, particularly as one of the only prominent women in the Senegalese art world at the time, and was considered a critical, independent voice at a time when much of the most visible art was state-sponsored.

Her position as a successful female artist in the Dakar art world in this period was unique, and she has been described as Senegal's first woman painter. Early in her career, she was often the only woman included in major exhibitions.

Sèye also sometimes wrote poetry, which she included in her art exhibitions.

== Acting ==
Sèye is also an actress, although she received no formal training in acting. She began acting in films as a young woman, going on to play several strong female roles.

She is best known for her appearances in several films by the Senegalese director Ousmane Sembène. She debuted in Mandabi, his first Wolof-language film, in 1968. She then portrayed Aram in Xala in 1974, with the film receiving significant international recognition.

Decades later, in 2000, she collaborated again with Sembène, playing the lead role in Faat Kiné under the stage name Venus Seye.
