= Sembene! =

- Film poster
- Directed by: Samba Gadjigo; Jason Silverman
- Production companies: Galle Ceddo Projects; Impact Partners; New Mexico Media Partners; SNE Partners; with major support from; The Ford Foundation/JustFilms; The Sundance Institute; Cinereach; Francophonie
- Release date: January 23, 2015 (Sundance Film Festival)
- Running time: 88 minutes

Sembene! is a 2015 documentary film focusing on the life of Senegalese filmmaker Ousmane Sembène, who is considered to be the father of African cinema. It is co-directed by Samba Gadjigo and Jason Silverman. The film's world premiere took place at the Sundance Film Festival in January 2015. It also played at the Cannes Film Festival and the Venice Film Festival.

== Synopsis ==
Sembene! tells the story of the self-taught novelist and filmmaker Ousmane Sembène, provided by Gadjigo, who wrote Sembene's biography. Sembène transitioned from a laborer into a powerful spokesman for Africa.

== Critical response ==
On the review aggregator website Rotten Tomatoes, the film has an approval rating of 91% based on 23 critics' reviews, with an average rating of 6.6/10.

Bilge Ebiri of Vulture included the film in a top ten list of films released in 2015, describing it as "a testament not just to the love of movies, but also to the power of movies." Chaz Ebert, writing for RogerEbert.com, listed the film as her eighth favorite of the year, writing that "I could actually feel the director's passion for his filmmaking, and his respect for the people he filmed."
