= Thiaroye massacre =

Massacre of French West African troops by French forces

- Part of French West Africa in World War II
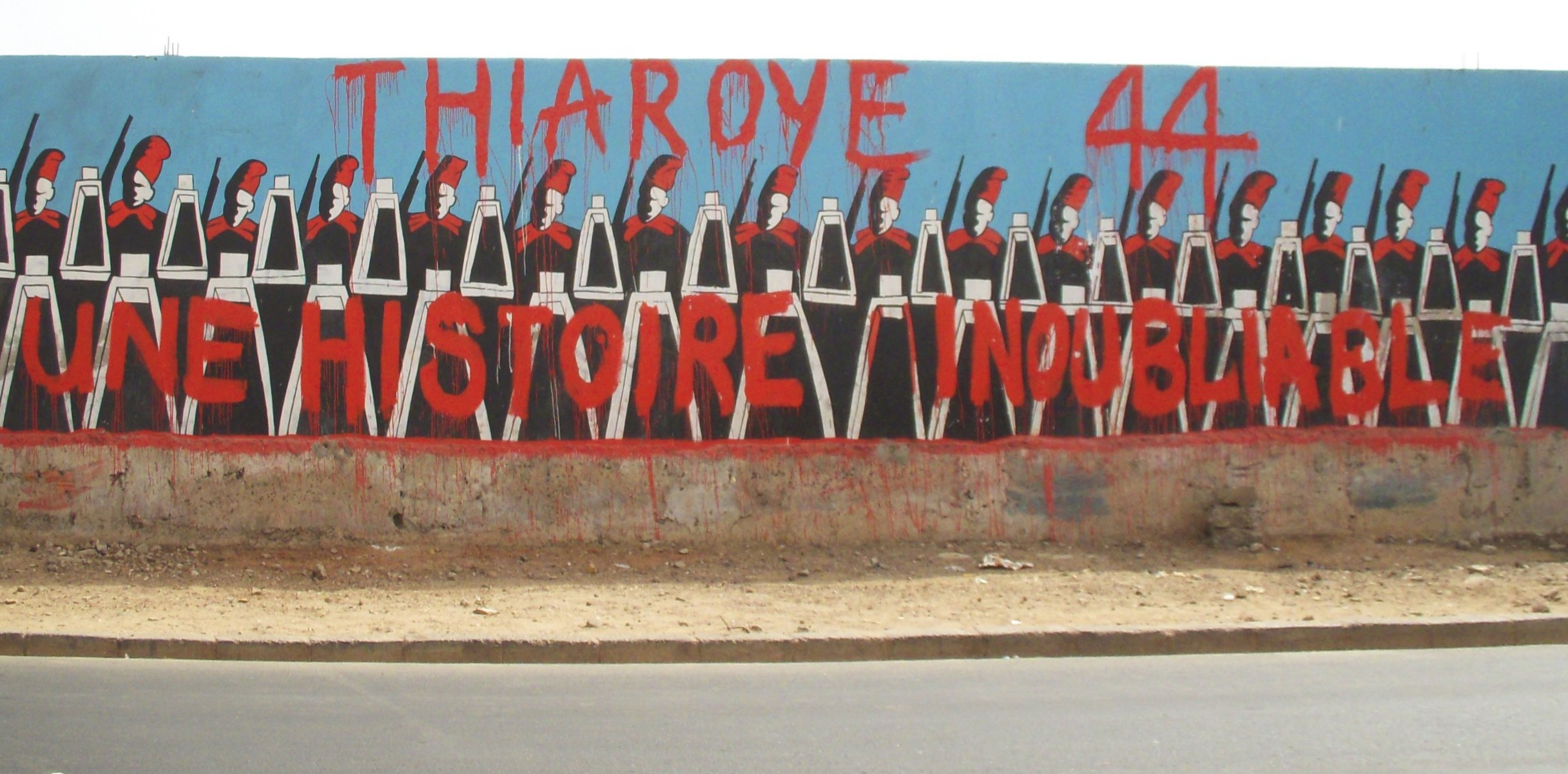
- Mural in Dakar; it reads "Thiaroye '44, an unforgettable event"

- Thiaroye massacre (Senegal)
- Location: 14.756°N 17.377°W; Thiaroye, Dakar, French West Africa
- Date: 1 December 1944; 9 a.m. (GMT)
- Attack type: Massacre of Tirailleurs Sénégalais mutinying against poor conditions and defaulted pay
- Deaths: Up to 300 (claimed by veterans); 70 (French military claim); 35 (French government claim)
- Injuries: Hundreds
- Perpetrators: French Army (1st Regiment of Senegalese Tirailleurs, 7th Regiment of Senegalese Tirailleurs, National Gendarmerie, 6th Regiment of Colonial Artillery)

The Thiaroye massacre (Note: French: Massacre de Thiaroye; pronounced [masakʁ də tja.ʁwa]) was a massacre of black African soldiers serving in French West Africa, committed by the French Army on the morning of 1 December 1944 near Dakar, French Senegal. Those killed were members of the Tirailleurs Sénégalais, and were veterans of the 1940 Battle of France who had been recently liberated from prison camps in Europe. After being repatriated to West Africa, they protested against poor conditions and unpaid wages at the Thiaroye military camp. Between 35 and 300 people were killed.

The official French version claimed the killings occurred in response to a massive armed mutiny. However, declassified military documents suggest the massacre was considered in advance (even prior to arrival in Senegal), and most or all of the victims were unarmed.

== Background ==
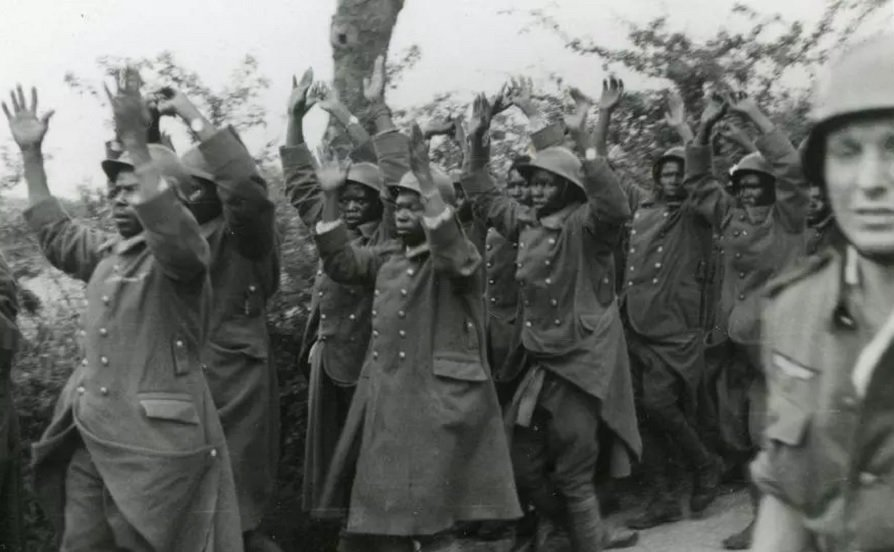
African tirailleurs captured by German troops during the Battle of France

During the Battle of France, around 120,000 soldiers from the French colonies were captured by German forces. Most of these troops came from the French North African possessions, while around 20 percent were from French West Africa. German troops summarily killed between 1,000 and 1,500 black prisoners in May and June 1940.

Unlike their white compatriots, the colonial prisoners of war were imprisoned in Frontstalags in France instead of being brought to Germany. Although they kept colonial troops in France on the pretext of preventing the spread of tropical diseases, the Germans also wanted to prevent the "racial defilement" (Rassenschande) of German women outlawed by the Nuremberg Laws of 1935.

After the Allied landings in Normandy in June 1944, the African troops interned in Frontstalags all over France were liberated by advancing Allied troops and subsequently repatriated to French West Africa.

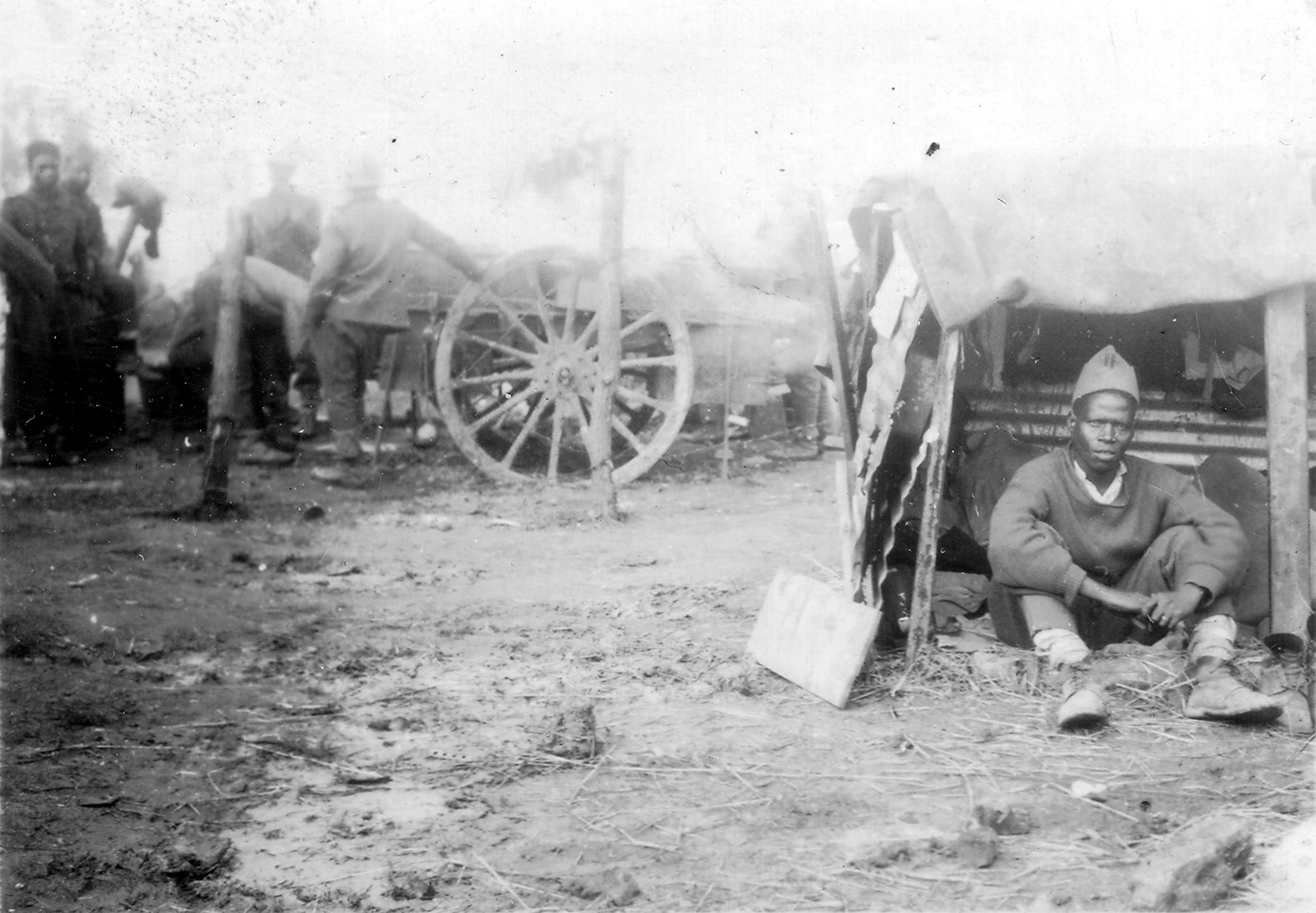
African prisoners of war in the Frontstalag of Dijon

Ever since their liberation, discontent had been growing among the former prisoners. The utter disorganization of French authorities had led to several delays concerning their repatriation. More importantly, they had not yet received their demobilization benefits, and only a 1,500-franc advance payment was awarded to them before they embarked to Dakar; about 300 of the former prisoners refused to embark because they had been refused all advance payment, and an October 1944 French circulaire had stipulated they needed to receive a quarter of the pay before leaving. Other matters of contention included the exchange rates between the Metropolitan French franc and the local colonial franc, as well as issues regarding savings made during their internment and their right to demobilization clothes.

On 5 November, a group of 1,635 former prisoners of war embarked in Morlaix on the British ship Circassia. The group landed in Dakar on 21 November and were temporarily assigned to the military camp of Thiaroye.

On 25 November, a group that was supposed to depart for Bamako on that same day refused to leave Thiaroye until the matter was settled. The act of disobedience prompted Brigadier General Marcel Dagnan to visit the camp on 28 November. During his visit, Dagnan was shocked by the hostility that he encountered. His car was blocked and possibly damaged, and he claimed he had been close to being taken hostage by the men. He declared the camp in open mutiny and decided to make a show of force to bring it back under his authority.

== Massacre ==
On the morning of 1 December at 6:30 a.m., three companies of the 1st Regiment of Senegalese Tirailleurs and the 7th Regiment of Senegalese Tirailleurs, backed by elements from local National Gendarmerie units, elements from the 6th Regiment of Colonial Artillery and one M3 Stuart light tank, entered the military camp.

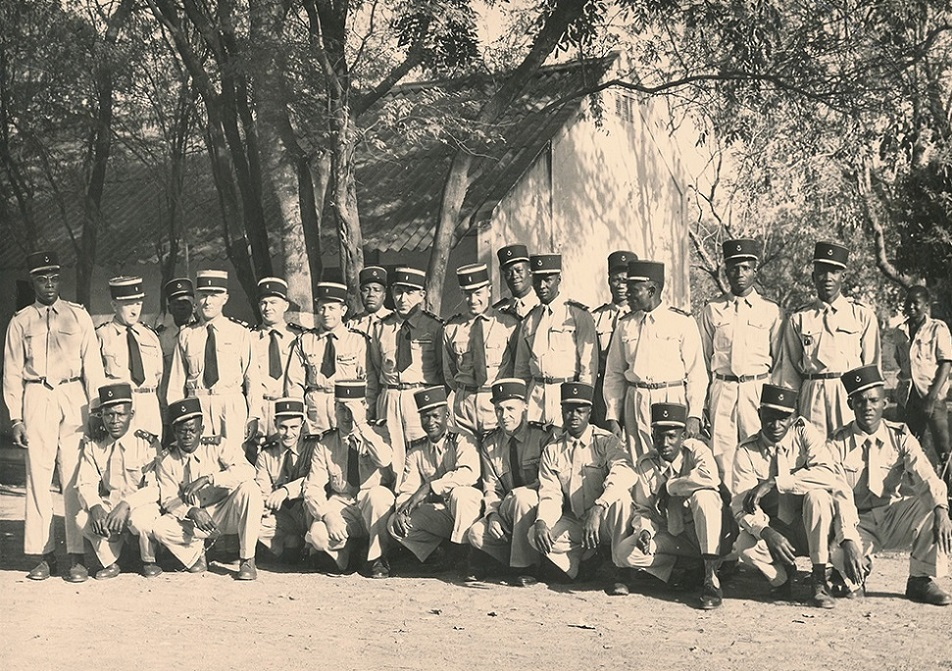
A National Gendarmerie section in Senegal in the mid 20th century

According to official reports, at around 7:30 one of the mutineers pulled a knife, but was soon disarmed. At around 8:45, a gunshot was heard, but claimed no victim.

The deadly confrontation occurred around 9:30 a.m. Accounts vary regarding what ignited the gunfight. According to some versions, it began when one of the mutineers opened fire from one of the barracks, while other versions put the blame on a warning shot fired by a soldier of the repression force to intimidate the mutineers. By contrast, the report of a squadron chief present on the ship Circassia as well as the testimony of the lieutenant colonel Jean Le Berre suggest that the killing of the soldiers was planned or at least considered in advance, and that they had only recently woken up when the assembled military units entered the camp and unexpectedly surrounded them.

In any case, a fusillade ensued, which lasted for less than a minute but killed and wounded at least several dozens among the mutineers and wounded three men among the forces sent to repress the mutiny. The official report of December 2 states that 24 of the mutineers were killed outright and 45 were wounded, 11 of whom subsequently died of their wounds. A report by Dagnan on December 5 however speaks of 24 killed outright and 46 who later died of their wounds at the hospital, thus totaling 70 deaths. According to an article published in Al Jazeera on 22 November 2013, some veterans later claimed that the death toll actually reached as high as 300 dead.

== Aftermath ==
On 4 December 1944, a circulaire from the war ministry falsely claimed all of the liberated prisoners had already received their full pay before the events at Thiaroye had occurred.

The army captain Castel reported that upon arriving in Morocco in January 1945 with a contingent of Senegalese troops, he informed them of the fate of their "predecessors" under the "disciplinary measures" enforced at Thiaroye. Castel boasted that acts of indiscipline among his soldiers quickly vanished after this warning and that they "became sheep" for the rest of the expedition.

In 1945, 34 of the mutineers, who were thought to be the instigators of the insurrection, were tried and given sentences ranging from one to ten years of prison. They were later pardoned as French President Vincent Auriol visited Senegal in March 1947, but they were not exonerated, and the widows of the fallen mutineers of 1944 were never awarded the veteran pensions usually granted to widows of fallen soldiers. After the war ended, the French argued that the tirailleurs were particularly prone to revolt. The French have based this claim on the notion that German soldiers, in an attempt to undermine the loyalty of France's colonial subjects in Africa, had given the tirailleurs favoured treatment as prisoners of war. The ostensibly-superior treatment of tirailleurs in prisoner-of-war camps was not, however, based in fact.

The Thiaroye massacre is not taught in schools in France, and a Senegalese film about the massacre released in 1988, Camp de Thiaroye, was both banned in France and censored in Senegal. A new generation of French leadership wants to confront the past and even planned to build an exhibition about the incident, which would travel to former French colonies in Western Africa in 2013. While the incident is merely mentioned, there is a military cemetery in Senegal that is unkempt and receives no visitors. The cemetery holds the unmarked mass graves of the fallen Senegalese soldiers. The Senegalese Army prevents any film or photography of the cemetery, and many locals consider the cemetery to be haunted by the fallen Senegalese soldiers still awaiting the vengeance of their honor. On July 18, 2024, six of the victims were declared “dead for France” by the French National Office of Combatants and War Victims.

In 2014, French President François Hollande acknowledged the incident as a "bloody repression". In 2024, president Emmanuel Macron called the event a "massacre" in a letter to Senegalese president Bassirou Diomaye Faye.

On June 24, 2025, Biram Senghor launched a legal complaint against France and unidentified persons for "concealment of a corpse". Biram is the son of rifleman M'Bap Senghor, who was shot by the French colonial army on December 1, 1944, for having requested payment of his salary. Biram's lawsuit argues that France deliberately withheld key historical records and the locations of mass graves.

== In art and literature ==
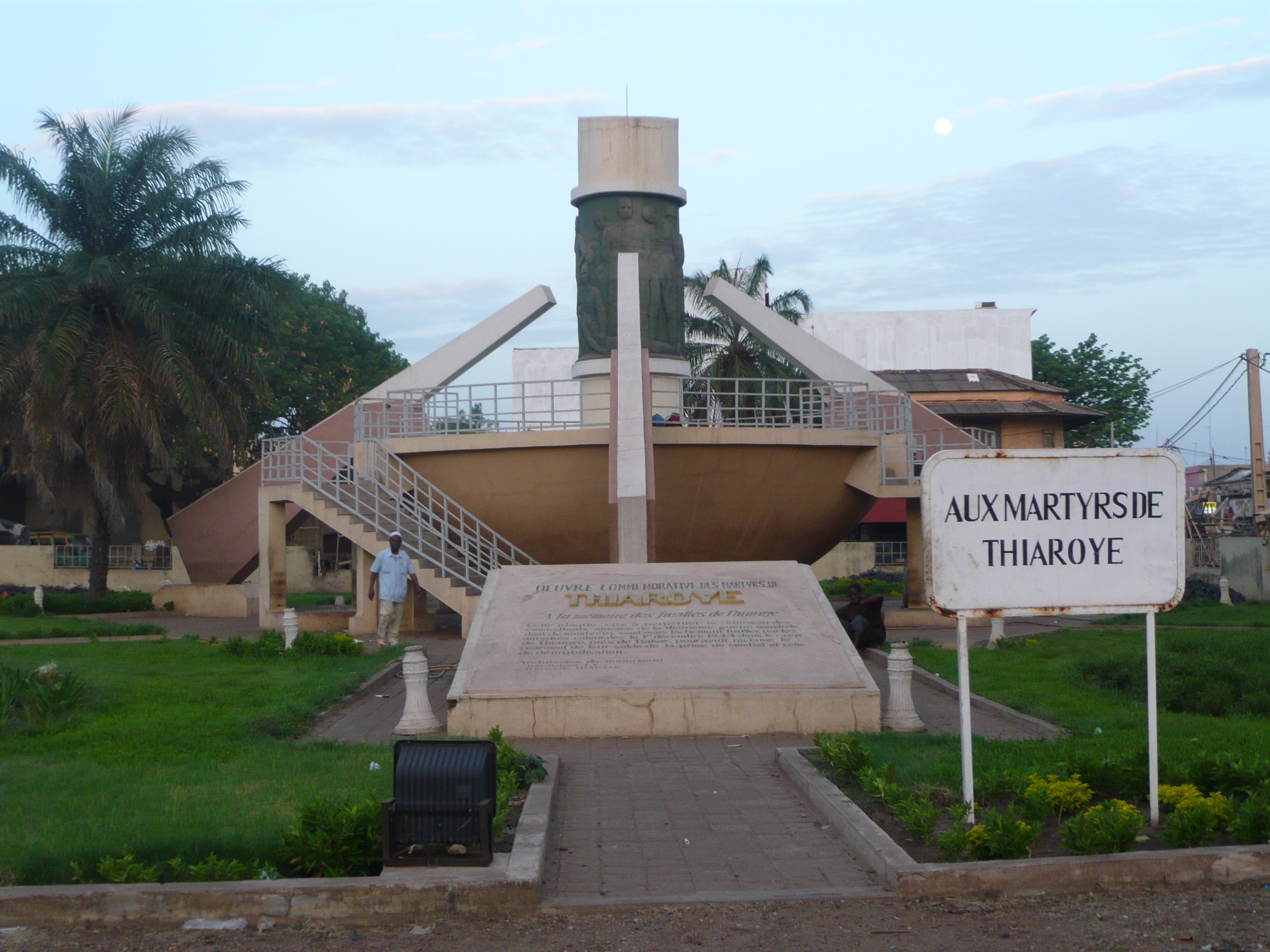
Memorial in Bamako, Mali

Senegalese author and filmmaker Ousmane Sembène directed a film, Camp de Thiaroye (1988), documenting the events leading up to the Thiaroye massacre, as well as the massacre itself. The film is considered historical fiction, as the characters are not necessarily based on actual tirailleurs who were killed. The film received positive reviews when it was released and continues to be heralded by scholars as important historical documentation of the massacre. The movie was banned in France for over a decade.

The Guinean writer Fodéba Keïta wrote and staged the narrative poem Aube africaine ("African Dawn", 1957) as a theatre-ballet based on the massacre. In African Dawn, a young man called Naman complies with the French colonial rulers by fighting in the French Army only to be killed in Thiaroye. His works were banned in French Africa as he was considered radical and anticolonial.

The Senegalese statesman and poet Léopold Sédar Senghor wrote the poem Thiaroye as a tribute to the victims of the massacre.

== See also ==
- Thiès massacre, another massacre in Senegal in 1938
- Sétif and Guelma massacre
- African-American veterans lynched after World War I
