= Katy Léna N'diaye =

Senegalese film director

- Born: 1979 (age 46–47); Thies, Senegal
- Citizenship: New York City
- Occupations: journalist; documentary filmmaker; screen writer; director; producer; actor
- Known for: Traces, empreintes de femmes (Traces, Women's Imprints, 2003), En attendant les hommes (Waiting for Men, 2007)

Katy Léna N'diaye (born 1979) is a Senegalese journalist and documentary filmmaker, best known for her documentaries about women muralists in Africa.

== Life ==
Born in Thies, Senegal, N'diaye grew up in Dakar. She has worked as a journalist for TV5 Monde, hosting a TV magazine Reflets Sud.

In 2003 N'diaye directed her first documentary Traces on mural painting by Kassena women in Burkina Faso. In the documentary, three old women explain the content of the murals covering the reddish-clay huts to Anetina, a young unmarried woman. Awaiting for Men documented three older women talking as they painted the town wall in Oualata, an oasis town on the edge of the Sahara Desert in southeast Mauritania.

== Filmography ==
Year	Film	Genre	Role	Duration (min)
2003	Traces, empreintes de femmes (Traces, Women's Imprints)	Documentary	Director, screenwriter	55 m.
2007	En attendant les hommes (Waiting for Men)	Documentary	Director, screenwriter	56 m.
2018	Amin by Philippe Faucon	Fiction feature	Actor	91 m.
2019	On a le temps pour nous (Time is on our side)	Documentary	Director, screenwriter, co-producer	67 m.
2022	L'argent, la liberté, une histoire du franc CFA (Money, Freedom, a Story of CFA Franc)	Documentary	Director, producer	101 m.
2022	Maayo Wonaa Keerol (Le fleuve n'est pas une frontière) by Alassane Diago	Documentary	Producer	105 m.
