= Les Larmes de l'émigration =

- Directed by: Alassane Diago
- Screenplay by: Alassane Diago
- Produced by: Les Films de l'Atelier Corto Pacific TV Rennes 35
- Cinematography: Alassane Diago
- Edited by: Annie Waks
- Music by: Hakuhachi Mediation
- Release date: 2010
- Running time: 78 minutes
- Countries: France; Senegal

Les Larmes de l'émigration (French for "the tears of emigration") is a 2010 documentary film directed by Alassane Diago.

== Synopsis ==
The film is the story of Alassane's mother, who has been waiting for her husband for 20 years. It is also the story of his sister, who also waits for her husband who left five years ago, and his niece, who does not know her father. After a two-year absence, Alassane Diago returns to Agnam Lidoubé, a Senegalese village in the Fouta region, to try and understand why and how his mother has spent all these years waiting. His camera technique captures the inner beauty and strength of the characters.

== Awards ==
The film was selected for official competition at the Festival International du Film Francophone de Namur, and received the Prix du Griot d’Ebène for best documentary at the African Film Festival of Cordoba.
