= Guelwaar =

1993 French-Senegalese film

- Directed by: Ousmane Sembène
- Written by: Ousmane Sembène
- Produced by: Jacques Perrin; Ousmane Sembène
- Starring: Abou Camara; Marie Augustine Diatta; Mame Ndoumbé Diop
- Cinematography: Dominique Gentil
- Edited by: Marie-Aimée Debril
- Music by: Baaba Maal
- Distributed by: New Yorker Films
- Release date: 28 July 1993 (U.S.)
- Running time: 115 minutes
- Countries: France; Senegal
- Languages: Wolof; French

Guelwaar is a 1993 French-Senegalese drama film written and directed by Ousmane Sembène. The name is borrowed from the Serer pre-colonial dynasty of Guelowar. The film won The President of the Italian Senate's Gold Medal at the 49th Venice International Film Festival.

== Plot ==
A Catholic and a Muslim die the same day. Relatives of the Muslim went to claim his body for burial, but due to an administrative error they got the body of a Catholic Christian man whose family had to settle for an empty casket. The burial of a Christian man, a political activist and dissident, by a Muslim family sets off a conflagration of satire and comedy in a deeply religious community. The film, said to be based on a true story, is a biting drama about North-South power relations and socio-economic development, inter-religious communal tensions, African religion and African pride, with a nod to Thomas Sankara and pan-Africanism.

In a scene in the film, the lead actor who plays Guelwaar, Thierno NDIAYE Doss, recites a verse about African pride and dignity from Kocc Barma Fall, the 17th-century Senegambian philosopher and lamane.

== Cast ==
- Thierno Ndiaye "Doss" as Guelwaar
- Marie Augustine Diatta
- Mame Ndoumbé Diop as Nogoy Marie Thioune
- Ndiawar Diop as Barthelemy
- Lamine Mane as Dibocor

== Release ==
The film was slated for release in Senegal alongside the 1993 elections, but was blocked from being shown as it dealt with themes critical to Senegal's governmental policy regarding foreign aid.

Guelwaar was released theatrically in France by Les Films du Paradoxe in 1993. It received an American home video release with independent distributor New Yorker Films that same year, though it has been out of print since the company shut down in 2018.

== See also ==
- Guelowar (a Serer maternal dynasty)
- Cinema of Senegal
