= Mandabi =

1968 Senegalese feature film by Osmane Sembène

- French poster
- Directed by: Ousmane Sembène
- Written by: Ousmane Sembène
- Produced by: Ousmane Sembène
- Starring: Makhourédia Guèye; Ynousse N'Diaye; Isseu Niang
- Cinematography: Paul Soulignac
- Edited by: Gilou Kikoïne; Max Saldinger
- Release dates: 1968; 2021 (remastered version)
- Running time: 92 minutes
- Countries: France; Senegal
- Languages: Wolof; French

Mandabi (French: Le Mandat, "The Money Order") is a 1968 film written and directed by Senegalese filmmaker Ousmane Sembène. The film is based on Sembène's francophone novel The Money-Order and it is the first feature film in the Wolof language, Sembène's native tongue, and the first feature-length film in an African language. Since most of the Senegalese population at the time did not understand French, Sembène wanted to create cinema for Wolof speakers.

== Plot ==
An illiterate, unemployed, middle-aged, Wolof-speaking Muslim man, Ibrahima Dieng, lives with his two wives and seven children in Dakar. His nephew, Abdou, sends him a money order from Paris worth 25,000 francs, which he has saved from working as a street sweeper. Ibrahima is to keep some of the money for himself, save a portion for his nephew, and give a portion to his sister, Abdou's mother.

However, Ibrahima faces numerous difficulties trying to obtain the money order. Not having an ID, Ibrahima must go through several levels of modern, post-colonial Senegalese bureaucracy to try to get one, only to fail after spending money he does not have. Meanwhile, neighbors come over asking for money and Ibrahima is further indebted. In the end, he is swindled by Mbaye, his unscrupulous nephew, who promised to cash the money order for him, but steals the money, saying that he was pickpocketed. The film leaves Ibrahima in debt. The film explores themes of neocolonialism, religion, corruption, and relationships in Senegalese society.

== Remastered print ==
After the film had not been accessible to cinema audiences for years, it was remastered in 4K resolution and presented at the 2019 Lumière Festival in Lyon, France. In June 2021, this remastered version was shown in cinemas in the United Kingdom. The Criterion Collection soon released the film on Blu-ray and DVD, which includes an introduction from African film scholar Aboubakar Sanogo; a conversation between Senegalese novelist Boubacar Boris Diop and Senegalese sociologist Marie Angélique Savané; unseen interview footage from Senegalese filmmaker Samba Gadjigo and American director Jason Silverman’s documentary film Sembène! (2015); and Tauw, a short film Sembène released in 1970.

== Accolades ==
- 29th Venice International Film Festival 1968: Special Jury Prize
- Soviet Directors Prize from the 1968 Tashkent Film Festival of African and Asian Cinema

== See also ==
- Cinema of Senegal
