= Samba Gadjigo =

Senegalese filmmaker

- Born: Samba Gadjigo; October 12, 1954 (age 71); Kidira, Senegal
- Education: University of Dakar; Ecole Normale Supérieure de Dakar; University of Illinois at Urbana-Champaign
- Occupations: Director, producer, screenwriter, lecturer
- Years active: 1986–present

Samba Gadjigo (born 12 October 1954), is a Senegalese filmmaker and writer. He is most notable as the director of critically acclaimed film Sembene!.

== Personal life ==
He was born on 12 October 1954 in Kidira, Senegal. He graduated from the University of Dakar and Ecole Normale Supérieure de Dakar, then received his PhD from the University of Illinois at Urbana-Champaign. He currently works as the Professor of French in Mount Holyoke College, Massachusetts since 1986.

== Career ==
In 2015, he directed the film Sembene! along with Jason Silverman. The film was based on the life of Senegalese filmmaker Ousmane Sembène often known as the father of African cinema. The film had its first public screening at Sundance Film Festival in Utah. The film received critical acclaim and won several awards and accolades at international film festivals. The film was a finalist for the Camera d’Or in the 2015 Cannes Film Festival as well as won the Jury Prize at the 2016 Luxor African Film Festival. It also won the Prix de la Jeuness at the 2017 Escales Documentaires de Libreville and then won the Paul Robeson Prize at the 2016 Newark Black Film Festival. The film later received the Prize for Best Documentary at the Emerge Film Festival.

In 2016, Gadjigo received the Faculty Award for Scholarship. Apart from filmmaking, he is also a prolific author and contributed with African Cinema and Human Rights, Research in African Literatures, and Contributions in Black Studies. In March 2016, he was honored with Meribeth E. Cameron Faculty Award for Scholarship from Mount Holyoke College.

== Filmography ==
Year	Film	Role	Genre	Ref.
2015	Sembene!	Director, producer, writer	Documentary	

== See also ==
- Cinema of Africa
