= In Vitro (film) =

Australian science-fiction film

- Theatrical release poster
- Directed by: Will Howarth; Tom McKeith
- Screenplay by: Will Howarth; Tom McKeith; Talia Zucker
- Produced by: Will Howarth; Lisa Shaunessy
- Starring: Ashley Zukerman; Talia Zucker
- Cinematography: Shelley Farthing-Dawe
- Edited by: Paul Murphy; Luca Cappelli; Will Howarth; Tom McKeith
- Music by: Helena Czajka
- Production company: Fictious
- Distributed by: Madman Entertainment
- Release dates: June 2024 (SFF); 27 March 2025 (Australia)
- Running time: 88 minutes
- Country: Australia
- Language: English

In Vitro is a 2024 Australian science-fiction film. It premiered at the 71st Sydney Film Festival.

== Premise ==
On a remote cattle farm, some years in the future, a husband and wife experiment with biotechnology and developing new farming methods.

== Summary ==
Jack and Layla run a struggling cattle farm in a future where food is scarce, particularly meat. Their farm uses cloning technology to produce more meat as opposed to the more commonplace labgrown meat industry. In their large work shed, there is an old cloning tank, now operational, covered by a shroud, that Jack claims he's using for some tests.

The couple's home is very isolated, and storms rage every night, disrupting their internet connection. Their young son, Toby, attends a boarding school. Layla wishes to visit him, but Jack is reluctant as he needs her to help on the farm. We see flashes of memories with Toby as a young child from before he began attending school. While painting Toby's room, Layla notices that the present off-white covers a previous layer of blue paint that she didn't know was there.

One night, while Jack is working in the shed, an alarm sounds. Layla goes to investigate and finds Jack on the floor with a head injury. He claims he was knocked down by a spooked cow. The next morning, Layla wakes before Jack and hears something in their kitchen. She waits for the sound to stop and enters to find all the cabinets are open. She checks outside, bringing their shotgun, and is attacked by what is revealed to be a clone of herself.

Layla's clone had assaulted Jack and was looking for painkillers in the house before fleeing and attacking Layla. She runs away and Layla sobs, panicked, before regaining composure and returning to the house where she acts like everything is normal. Later, she finds her clone in the shed and they discuss leaving with the cattle driver, Brady. However, they see Jack firing Brady via the security cameras and Brady leaves.

Jack learns of Layla's knowledge of her clone and explains that she was created as a test of human cloning technology, which he was working on as another means of making money. He explains her clone was not supposed to awaken and is now dying due to typical clone illness. He tells Layla they will help the clone, but tricks her into administering a poison to kill her. Layla discovers this and once again attempts to flee with her clone, threatening Jack with their shotgun to unlock the warehouse door and let them go. They go to lock Jack in the office, but Jack distracts Layla while her clone looks for the keys and he wrestles the gun from Layla and attempts to shoot the clone. Brady enters and knocks Jack unconscious before helping the women escape. Jacks pursues them with the shotgun, firing on them as they drive away in Brady's car.

They are forced to pull over when the car breaks down due to being damaged by the bullets. They flee on foot until nightfall and try to get help, but there is no signal on Brady's phone. Brady reveals Jack hired him off the books because the farm is operating illegally.

The group of three seek shelter in a dilapidated barn on a shuttered cattle farm. Layla's clone grows sicker. Brady returns to the car with tools from the barn and begins fixing it. Cautious that Jack may be lurking nearby, he calls for him to show himself. Jack attacks Brady and kills him.

In the morning, the women are awoken by Brady's car approaching, but realise it isn't Brady because something strange is happening to Layla's wedding band, which is actually a tracking device. The women hide in the barn as Jack shouts for Layla to come out. The women manage to escape outside, but the clone vomits blood and cannot go on. She urges Layla to go to their son, Toby, and keep him safe from Jack. The clone lures Jack away from the car and to a nearby ruined building and dies.

Layla finds Brady's car and begins driving to Toby's school. Jack stands in the road and begs her to reconsider, saying he'll be arrested if the government finds out he cloned humans, but she continues driving.

Layla stops at a service station and calls Toby's school from a public phone. The person from the school tells her Toby hasn't been a student there for several years and that she thought the family had moved to another suburb, Fairview. Layla drives to Fairview and spots Toby, now a teenager, exiting the high school, being picked up by another Layla. She follows them to their house, then breaks in after seeing the two leave again.

Inside the house she finds documents regarding her apparent divorce from and restraining order against Jack. Toby comes home and Layla hugs him. Layla then goes to the hospital where the original Layla works and observes her chatting to a colleague. She leaves.

Back at the cattle farm, Jack is packing and preparing to burn the farm down when Layla returns. Layla questions Jack about the clones and he confesses he was planning to replace her again because she was unhappy. She offers to forget everything that has happened so they can have a fresh start together, as there is nothing out in the world for her anymore. Jacks promises everything will be better now then on. After they kiss, Layla leaves the room briefly and returns with the shotgun, shooting Jack in the head before he notices her. She unlocks the mysterious cloning tank using Jacks severed finger/hand and uses it to make a clone of Toby, which she raises by herself while continuing to run the farm.

== Cast ==
- Ashley Zukerman as Jack
- Talia Zucker as Layla
- Will Howarth as Brady

== Production ==
The film is directed by Will Howarth and Tom McKeith. It is written by Will Howarth and Talia Zucker who also star, alongside Ashley Zukerman. Principal photography took place in New South Wales, in Goulburn and Cooma over five weeks, finishing by March 2022. Funding came from Screen Australia and Screen NSW. Helena Czajka composed the score for the film, while Paul Murphy, Luca Cappelli, Howarth, and McKeith edited the film.

== Release ==
The film premiered at the 71st Sydney Film Festival. The film was released theatrically in Australia on 27 March 2025.

== Reception ==
On the review aggregator website Rotten Tomatoes, 100% of 15 critics' reviews are positive.
