= Moolaadé =

- Directed by: Ousmane Sembène
- Written by: Ousmane Sembène
- Produced by: Ousmane Sembène; Thierry Lenouvel
- Starring: Fatoumata Coulibaly; Hélène Diarra
- Cinematography: Dominique Gentil
- Edited by: Abdellatif Raïss
- Music by: Boncana Naiga
- Release date: 15 May 2004 (Cannes Film Festival)
- Running time: 124 minutes
- Countries: Senegal; France; Burkina Faso; Cameroon; Morocco; Tunisia
- Languages: Fula; French; Bambara
- Box office: US$434,600

Moolaadé ("magical protection") is a 2004 film by the Senegalese writer and director Ousmane Sembène. It addresses the subject of female genital mutilation, a common practice in a number of African countries, from Egypt to Nigeria. The film was a co-production between companies from several Francophone nations: Senegal, France, Burkina Faso, Cameroon, Morocco, and Tunisia. It was filmed in the remote village of Djerrisso, Burkina Faso. The film argues strongly against the practice, depicting a village woman, Collé, who uses moolaadé (magical protection) to protect her daughter and a group of younger girls. She is opposed by the villagers who believe in the necessity of female genital cutting, which they call "purification". This was Sembène's last film before his death in 2007.

== Context ==
To outsiders, the act known as "female genital cutting" is often shocking. Practitioners surgically remove part or all of the female genitals. Traditionally, it is cut with an iron sheet or a knife, then sutured back with needlework or a thorn. There is no anesthetic during the whole process, and the disinfection is not thorough. Gynecologist Dr Rosemary Mburu of Kenya estimates that as much as 15% of circumcised girls die of the excessive loss of blood or infection of the wound.

== Plot ==
The film is set in a colourful Bambara village in Burkina Faso dotted with termite mounds, and a mosque made from clay that resembles a gigantic hedgehog. The village is a symbol of green Africa, a time capsule that nonetheless is not immune to the influences of the outside and 'modern' world.

Collé is the second of her husband's three wives, and is the most beloved by her husband, a temperate and calmer man than many others in the village. Her daughter, Amasatou, has become engaged, although she has not undergone female genital cutting, considered a prerequisite for marriage in the local tradition. Collé opposes this practice, which has led the elders in the village, women as well as men, to despise her daughter. Amasatou herself unceasingly requests to have her genitals cut to secure her social status and marriage acceptance, but Collé remains unmoved. She is approached by four little girls who are afraid and escape the ritual of the practice, and Collé draws a symbolic line, the colorful rope Moolaadé, a "magical protection," across the gate of the family's premises. Moolaadé prevents the women elders who carry out the practice, and who have been searching for the girls, from entering the house.

In the beginning, the first wife seems to be against Collé's plan to protect the girls. However, later they become closer and she tells Collé that she also opposes female genital cutting. She feared making it known, but has been helping her all along, without anyone's notice.

While facing her daughter's request to be circumcised, Collé explains that she does not want her daughter to end up on the same road she travelled. Her first reason is that it has too many indefinite outcomes, some of which can be fatal. An even bigger reason is that Collé had two unsuccessful pregnancies before Amasatou, which caused her great physical and emotional pain and were almost fatal. In a flashback, there is a scene of her and her husband having sexual intercourse which is clearly causing her physical pain. He falls asleep, while she is unable to do so because the sexual intercourse brings unbearable pain for her rather than pleasure. She keeps biting her ring finger, symbol of her marriage, and dares not say a single word even when her finger bleeds. At dawn, she is still awake to wash her body, as well as her blood off the bed sheet.

As Collé represents African women who awaken to resist patriarchal control, her daughter's fiancé Ibrahima, a rich and open-minded young man living in France, returns to the village, and represents the enlightened educated abroad who returns home and observes the tradition of his village. He witnesses a funeral of two little girls, who desperately drowned themselves in a well to avoid the mutilation of their genitals. The girls' relatives are sad, but the incident does not lead the villagers to question the tradition. Ibrahima is shocked and worried by this; meanwhile, Ibrahima's father wants him to renounce his engagement to Amasatou, and marry his innocent eleven-year-old cousin instead, who has already undergone female genital cutting. Ibrahima refuses to do so, recognizing such an act as child abuse, and visits Amasatou's house despite what the villagers say. He confirms her as his fiancée, regardless of her "impure" status according to the local tradition.

The African women's daily entertainment is enjoying the radio which transmits music and news of the world, which the male elders deem to be counterproductive and dangerous. The elders think that Ciré Bathiliy, Collé's husband, has lost the ability to control his own wife, so the elders insist that he beat her with a leather whip in front of the village to show that he still controls her. The elders want her to utter the word to end the moolaade, so they can take the four girls from her protection. Her husband whips her, but she endures and refuses to give her tormentors the satisfaction of a giving in. Opposite groups of men and women shout to her to revoke or to be steadfast, but no woman interferes. When she is on the verge of collapse, a merchant steps out and stops the whipping.

The womanizing merchant is called Mercenaire by people in the village. He is a war veteran who has become a travelling merchant after being discharged from the army after he accused his superiors of corruption. When he converses with Ibrahima, he accuses him, his father, and his uncle of pedophilia and is suddenly no longer concerned about the money that he could possibly get from the rich young man. He is bringing all the plastic junk to the village; the junk is brightly and boldly colored as the magnificent costumes the people wear in Africa. He sells his wares at extremely high prices. Later he is hunted out of the village and, when out of sight, murdered.

During the whipping, one of the four girls' mother steals her daughter from Collé's house and sends her to get her genitals cut, although the little girl screams and tries to resist. The girl dies as a result of the cutting and her mother regrets her previous support of the practice. The other mothers all see the tragedy happen and thus change their minds and begin opposing genital cutting. This persuades Collé to revoke the protection and return the children to their parents.

From the men's point of view, the radio is a bad influence on the women because it teaches them things from the outside world, such as the idea of equality or how excision is not truly necessary. Therefore, the elders decide to burn the radios that they confiscated earlier. Although all the radios are supposed to be burned, some are hidden by the women of the village. The women are united because of the pain caused by the genital cutting. They are all mourning, they are all awakened, and when the elders return, they are greeted with shouts of, "No more genital cutting!". Collé demands that the women give up their knives, which she then carries to the elders, proclaiming that genital cutting is now a thing of the past. After her demonstration, Ibrahima stands up to his father, says he is not going to listen to him, and despite his threats to disown him (which is quite foolish seeing how Ibrahima is the family's breadwinner) announces that he is going to marry Amasatou because he is proud of her. The end of the movie is the smoke of the burning radios, which speaks both to speaking out and repression of speech.

== Cast ==
- Fatoumata Coulibaly as Collé Gallo Ardo Sy, the second wife who protects the girls from the female genital cutting.
- Maimouna Hélène Diarra as Hadjatou
- Salimata Traoré as Amasatou
- Dominique Zeïda as Mercenaire
- Mah Compaoré as Doyenne des Exciseuses
- Aminata Dao as Alima Bâ
- Stéphanie Nikiema as Mah
- Mamissa Sanogo as Oumy
- Rasmane Ouedraogo as Ciré Bathily
- Ousmane Konaté as Amath Bathily
- Bakaramoto Sanogo as Abdou
- Modibo Sangaré as Balla Bathily
- Joseph Traoré as Dugutigi
- Théophile Sowié as Ibrahima (as Moussa Théophile Sowié)
- Balla Habib Dembélé as Sacristain (as Habib Dembélé)
- Gustave Sorgho as Bakary
- Cheick Oumar Maiga as Kémo Tiékura
- Sory Ibrahima Koïta as Kémo Ansumana (as Ibrahima Sory Koita)
- Aly Sanon as Konaté
- Moussa Sanogo as Konaté fils
- Naky Sy Savané as Sanata (as Naki Sy Savane)
- Marie Yameogo as Exciseuse (as Marie Augustine Yameogo)
- Mabintou Baro as Exciseuse
- Tata Konaté as Exciseuse
- Fatoumata Sanogo as Exciseuse
- Madjara Konaté as Exciseuse
- Fatoumata Konaté as Exciseuse
- Fatoumata Sanou as Nafissatou
- Mariama Souabo as Jaatu
- Lala Drabo as Saaiba
- Georgette Paré as Niassi
- Assita Soura as Seymabou
- Alimatou Traoré as Binetou
- Edith Nana Kaboré as Ibatou
- Maminata Sanogo as Coumba
- Sanata Sanogo as La Reine mère
- Mafirma Sanogo as Fify

== Reception ==
=== Critical ===
This movie received positive reviews overall. On Metacritic it has a score of film 91 out of 100 based on 26 critics, in which 24 are positive and 2 are mixed. On Rotten Tomatoes, 99% of 74 critics gave the film a positive review, with an average score of 8.5/10 and the critics consensus calling it "a vibrant, powerful, and poignant glimpse into the struggles of women in modern Africa."

Roger Ebert of the Chicago Sun-Times called it "for me the best film at Cannes 2004, a story vibrating with urgency and life. It makes a powerful statement and at the same time contains humor, charm and astonishing visual beauty". Dana Stevens of The New York Times found "To skip Moolaade would be to miss an opportunity to experience the embracing, affirming, world-changing potential of humanist cinema at its finest." Desson Thomson of the Washington Post said "Moolaade, in short, is a movie to rock the soul". Kevin Thomas of the Los Angeles Times said, "There's such a rich sense of the fullness of life in Moolaadé that it sustains those passages that are truly and necessarily harrowing". Melissa Levine of Dallas Observer said "It's not easy to pull off a good morality tale. That's why Moolaade, the new film from 81-year-old Senegalese writer-director Ousmane Sembene, feels like such an exceptional success. Its moral center is painfully clear, but so is its humanity".

Kirk Honeycutt of The Hollywood Reporter gave a mixed review and announced that "As drama the film mostly serves to illustrate the two sides of this crucial social debate in Africa". Phil Hall of Film Threat gave only 40/100 and found the movie "Achieves the impossible in taking a genuine socio-political tragedy and turning it into an anvil drama which will fray the patience of the most sympathetic audiences".

=== Box office ===
Moolaadé took in $11,982 on its opening weekend. In 41 weeks, the total domestic is $215,646, foreign $218,907.

== Accolades ==
Film critic Roger Ebert was a big supporter of the film, naming it one of his top ten of the year, and later adding it to his list of great movies.

In 2016, the film was ranked among the 100 greatest films since 2000 in an international critics poll by 177 critics around the world.

| Year | Award | Category | Winner/Nominee | Result |
|---|---|---|---|---|
| 2004 | Cannes Film Festival | Prix Un Certain Regard | | Won |
| 2004 | Cannes Film Festival | Prize of the Ecumenical Jury | | special mention |
| 2004 | European Film Awards | Screen International Award | Ousmane Sembène | Nominated |
| 2004 | Marrakech International Film Festival | Special Jury Award | Ousmane Sembène | Won |
| 2004 | Marrakech International Film Festival | Golden Star | Ousmane Sembène | Nominated |
| 2004 | National Society of Film Critics Awards | Best Foreign Language Film | | Won |
| 2004 | Political Film Society Awards, USA | Award for Democracy | | Nominated |
| 2004 | Political Film Society Awards, USA | Award for Human Rights | | Nominated |
| 2005 | Cinemanila International Film Festival | Best actress | Fatoumata Coulibaly | Won |
| 2005 | Image Awards | Outstanding Independent or Foreign Film | | Nominated |
| 2005 | Pan-African Film Festival | jury award | Ousmane Sembène | Won |

== See also ==
- Cinema of Senegal
