= Camp de Thiaroye =

- Italian theatrical release poster
- Directed by: Ousmane Sembène; Thierno Faty Sow
- Written by: Ousmane Sembène; Thierno Faty Sow
- Produced by: Mustafa Ben Jemja; Ouzid Dahmane; Mamadou Mbengue
- Cinematography: Smaïl Lakhdar-Hamina
- Edited by: Kahéna Attia
- Music by: Ismaël Lô
- Production companies: Enaproc; Filmi Domirev; Films Kajoor; Satpec; Société Nouvelle Pathé Cinéma
- Distributed by: New Yorker Films
- Release date: 1988
- Running time: 157 minutes
- Country: Senegal
- Languages: French; English; Wolof

Camp de Thiaroye ([kɑ̃ də tjaʁ.wa]; also known as The Camp at Thiaroye) is a 1988 Senegalese war-drama film written and directed by Ousmane Sembène and Thierno Faty Sow. It depicts the Thiaroye massacre, which occurred on the morning of December 1, 1944 in Thiaroye, Dakar. In the weeks leading up to the massacre, members of the Senegalese Tirailleurs at the Thiaroye military camp had been protesting poor camp conditions and revocation of promised demobilization benefits. With the camp declared to be in open mutiny, French forces opened fire on the mutineers. French authorities reported a death toll of 35, but estimates range up to 300.

A work of historical fiction, the film depicts the events leading up to the Thiaroye massacre as well as the massacre itself. Sembène's portrayal provides a heavy critique of French colonialism, particularly its dismissal of African demands and use of extreme brutality in response to disobedience. It also reflects criticisms of colonial ingratitude and betrayal, as soldiers felt indignant that their wartime sacrifices were being repaid in such a manner. The film received positive reviews at the time of its release, notably winning the Grand Jury Prize at the 45th Venice International Film Festival. It continues to be heralded by scholars as an important historical documentation of the Thiaroye massacre, playing a role in bringing the event back into public memory. The film was banned in France for a decade and censored in Senegal as well.

== Plot ==
A Senegalese platoon of soldiers from the French Free Army are returned from combat in France and held for a temporary time in a military encampment with barbed wire fences and guard towers in the desert. Among their numbers are Sergeant Diatta, the charismatic leader of the troop who was educated in Paris and has a French wife and child, and Pays, a Senegalese soldier left in a state of shock from the war and concentration camps and who can only speak in guttural screams and grunts.

All is well until the soldiers start to complain about the food offered in the camp, to which the French commander says he will do nothing about, as meat is reserved for white officers. To kill time, Sergeant Diatta goes into town to find a brothel, and is thrown out of one because he is African; he is subsequently found by American troops, who beat and capture him. As revenge, the Senegalese troops capture a white American soldier and an exchange is made between the two prisoners, and the Americans threaten to level the camp and kill everyone.

As the Senegalese troops are about to be transferred out of the camp, they learn they will only be given half the pay for their service as the French troops are unfairly converting French francs to Senegalese francs at half the rate to save money. The Senegalese troops capture the camp and take a French general hostage, beginning a mutiny. The mutiny ends when the general gives them his word that they will be given their proper pay. That night, they dance and celebrate. At about 3 am, Pays is in a watch tower and sees tanks approaching the camp, and wakes up the other soldiers, but is unable to tell them what is happening; they think he is saying that Nazis are invading the camp and dismiss him as being crazy. An hour or so later, the French tanks open fire on the camp, killing Diatta, Pays and the rest of the Senegalese platoon.

== Cast ==
- Sidiki Bakaba
- Hamed Camara
- Ismaël Lô
- Philippe Chamelat
- Marthe Mercadier
- Casimir Zoba, aka Zao
- Jean-Daniel Simon

Apart from Sidiki Bakaba and Mohamed Camara—along with a few French actors, a German, and an American—the cast consists almost entirely of amateurs.

== Production ==
The film is similar to an earlier work by Sembène, Emitaï (1971), which references the Effok massacre—an event in which a village was destroyed by colonial forces in 1943. The underlying aim is the same: to create a historical film that denounces colonialism.

Thierno Faty Sow decided to write the film after his father recounted his own experiences from 1944, when he was working as a postal inspector: he had written a piece for a newspaper and was asked to retract an article in which he criticized the colonists; subsequently transferred to a remote part of Senegal, he resigned and was not reinstated until 1951.

According to Cécile Van den Avenne, the screenplay uses its characters as archetypes, a choice that serves its political message; she cites the example of Staff Sergeant Diatta—a man who is highly acculturated yet out of place in both French and African societies, and consequently vulnerable.

Ousmane Sembène trained at film schools in the USSR during the 1960s. In Camp de Thiaroye, two scenes reference the Soviet cinema classic Battleship Potemkin: the scene where the tirailleurs protest the very poor quality of the food evokes a similar scene that sparks the mutiny on the Russian battleship, while the final massacre scene recalls the moment the Potemkin mutineers fire their cannons. These two references serve to frame the historical episode of the Thiaroye massacre as a precursor to the independence movements.

== Historical accuracy ==
Several elements of the film diverge from historical reality as it was understood when the screenplay was written or the film produced. Sabrina Parent argues that one must look beyond mere entertainment value or intellectual dishonesty, viewing certain scenes in Camp de Thiaroye as aesthetic choices and emphasizing the meticulous research Ousmane Sembène conducted prior to making the film. For instance, critic Kenneth Harrow faults the final scene for obscuring the faces of the perpetrators of the massacre (who, until the 2010s, were believed to be tirailleurs who had not mutinied); he accuses Sembène of a Manichaean portrayal—contrasting "good" colonized subjects with "bad" colonizers—thereby oversimplifying the situation. Yet, throughout the film, we see unarmed tirailleurs awaiting demobilization being guarded by armed tirailleurs, and armed tirailleurs threatening their protesting comrades on an officer's orders. Sembène therefore does not conceal the various attitudes adopted by the tirailleurs; indeed, he seeks to highlight them as part of his condemnation of colonialism—a system that places colonized people in precisely such untenable situations. Finally, the image of tanks firing machine guns into the night serves as a dramatic element, illustrating the disproportionate nature of the colonial authorities' response and the dehumanization at work in the colonies.

== Release ==
The continental premiere took place in Dakar on December 22, 1988, attended by the President of the Republic of Senegal, Abdou Diouf; the President of the National Assembly, Abdoul Aziz Ndaw; and the Minister of Culture, Robert Sagna. The film was subsequently released in Senegalese cinemas to great success.

Although it won the Special Jury Prize at the 1988 Venice Film Festival and the UNICEF Prize, the film was not released in French cinemas, earning it a reputation as a censored film (despite being shown at festivals and in occasional screenings). Since 1989, there has been speculation that the French state exerted pressure to have it pulled from theaters. The film was released in Italy in September 1988 in the 1988 Venice Film Festival, and on May 26, 1989 for the general release.

Two organizations are listed as distributors of the film: Médiathèque des Trois Mondes (M3M) for France, and New Yorker Films for the United States.

== Reception ==
The day after the film's premiere—attended by the President of the Republic, the President of the National Assembly, and the Minister of Communication—the newspaper Le Soleil ran the headline: "Grand Premiere of Camp de Thiaroye: A Spotlight on Oblivion." Critics praised the diverse psychological profiles of the characters; the film also established a parallel between the Thiaroye massacre and Nazi concentration camps. It achieved great success with both the public and critics in Senegal. During the first screening, the French ambassador to Dakar walked out of the theater.

Although not released in France, the film immediately provoked a reaction from institutions keen to reiterate the official version (that of the French army) of the Thiaroye massacre. The Inspectorate of Marine Troops (formerly colonial troops) of the French army issued a statement recalling that the officers had responded to a mutiny and that the massacre had produced a "salutary effect," restoring the tirailleurs to obedience. Meanwhile, the French embassy commissioned the priest Joseph Roger de Benoist—a historian at the Institut fondamental d'Afrique noire (IFAN)—to set the official record straight, providing him with access to certain archives. He published an article in Le Soleil on February 21, 1989, reiterating the key points of the version established by the army in 1944: the maintenance of discipline, the authenticity of the archives, and a death toll of 35.

When the film was screened in a small Paris cinema in 1998, L'Humanité, La Vie, Témoignage chrétien, and Le Canard enchaîné published favorable reviews, while the rest of the press either ignored the film or reacted negatively.

On the review aggregator website Rotten Tomatoes, 100% of 5 critics' reviews are positive.

=== Analysis ===
==== Role of language ====
The tirailleurs hail from across French West Africa; lacking a common language, they communicate using français tirailleur, a pidgin. For James Leahy, writing dialogue in this language was a highly appropriate choice—one that contributes to the film's dramaturgy and ensures that audiences across Francophone West Africa can follow the story. According to Cécile Van den Avenne, it also adds a layer of historical authenticity. Speech plays a crucial role in the film, as the tirailleurs seek redress for their grievances and challenge injustices.

The film illustrates the differing roles and dynamics of speech among the tirailleurs versus the Europeans. The white characters speak standard French, whereas the tirailleurs speak français tirailleur—with the exception of the staff sergeant. He speaks both varieties of French and is the only Francophone character capable of conversing in English; this skill humiliates the French officers but also leads to run-ins with the American military police. Alongside the military hierarchy, the hierarchy of languages is challenged; the use of français tirailleur facilitates this reversal because the language lacks a formal "you" (vous) form. Consequently, the usual dynamic—where officers use the informal "you" (tu) with the tirailleurs—is inverted: when the tirailleurs voice their grievances to the officers in their non-standard French, they address them using the informal tu (since the formal vous does not exist in their pidgin), thereby failing to signal respect through their choice of address.

Debate among the tirailleurs—reflecting African societal norms—plays a significant role; however, it takes on a unique character here because it unfolds between individuals who share no common language. They do so using the flawed tool of français tirailleur—demonstrating their eloquence and successfully developing a collective consciousness as colonized Africans—thereby enabling them to challenge the hierarchies imposed by white people. Français tirailleur thus serves as a weapon, turning the racist disparagement directed at it into an act of subversion.

Ultimately, certain scenes are resolved through the spoken word—such as the detention of the general, which ends with his pledge (repeated three times) that the currency exchange will take place at the correct rate. This marks the divide between two worlds: that of the tirailleurs, who believe in the spoken word, and that of the colonial officers, for whom it is merely a tool—even if it means lying.

=== Awards ===
- 1988 Venice Film Festival: Special Jury Prize, UNICEF Award.
- 1989 Panafrican Film and Television Festival of Ouagadougou: Institute of Black Peoples Prize.

The film was also screened at the 32nd London Film Festival.

=== Further releases ===
The film was released in France in 1998 in a limited number of art-house cinemas. It was released as a five-DVD box set by the Médiathèque des Trois Mondes and the Centre National de la Cinématographie in 2005.

=== Restoration ===
A restored version of the film was screened at the MAMI Mumbai Film Festival 2024 under the Restored Classics section. A restored version was also presented at the 2024 Cannes Film Festival—with the support of the Hobson/Lucas Family Foundation—by The Film Foundation's World Cinema Project and the Cineteca di Bologna at the L'Immagine Ritrovata laboratory, in association with the Tunisian Ministry of Culture and the Senegalese Ministry of Culture and Historical Heritage.

== See also ==
- Cinema of Senegal
