= Borom Sarret =

- Directed by: Ousmane Sembène
- Written by: Ousmane Sembène
- Starring: Ly Abdoulay
- Narrated by: Ousmane Sembène
- Distributed by: African Film Library
- Release date: 1963
- Running time: 18 minutes
- Country: Senegal
- Language: French

Borom Sarret or The Wagoner (French: Le Charretier) is a 1963 film by Senegalese director Ousmane Sembène, the first film over which he had full control. It is often called the first film (or first narrative film) made in Africa by an African; the first "professional" African film; or the first such film to be shown widely outside of Africa. However, this is disputed, with some other films, such as Song of Khartoum, Sarzan, and Mouramani having arguably been produced earlier. Thus, some authors refer to it as "among the first" films made in Africa by an African filmmaker. Borom Sarret is 18 minutes long and tells a story about a cart driver in Dakar. The film illustrates the poverty in Africa, showing that independence has not solved the problems of its people. It was shown as part of the Cannes Classics section of the 2013 Cannes Film Festival.

== Plot ==
The film follows a poor man in Dakar attempting to make a living as a cart driver (referred to in the subtitles as "The Wagoner"). While he hopes to be paid for his services, he knows that some of his passengers will not pay as they have little to no income. Sometimes, all he gets is a handshake. Among his customers is a man delivering his child's body to the cemetery. When the father is not allowed in to the cemetery because he does not have the correct papers, the wagoner places the body of the child at the father's feet and leaves him lamenting over his loss.

In another sequence, a well dressed man asks to be taken to the French quarter. The wagoner does not want to take him there because carts are not allowed there. The customer asserts that his connections enable him to disregard the rule, but they are stopped by a policeman who demands the cart driver's papers. When the cart driver pulls out his paperwork, a medallion drops to the ground and the policeman steps on it, refusing to move his foot. While the cart driver is being harassed by the policeman, the customer leaves into a car without paying his fare or defending the cart driver.

In the next scene, the cart driver has only his horse, as his cart has been confiscated in lieu of the fine. When he arrives home, the cart driver informs his wife that he has no money. His wife hands their baby to him, assures him that she will make sure they will eat, and leaves the premises with the implication that she will engage in sex work.

== See also ==
- Cinema of Senegal
