= Niaye =

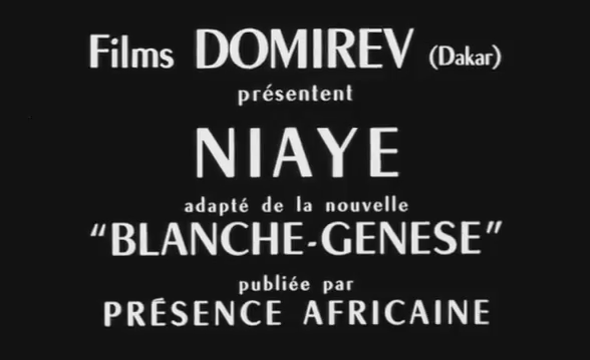
- Directed by: Ousmane Sembène
- Written by: Ousmane Sembène
- Based on: Vehi-Ciosane ou Blanche-Genèse
- Starring: Sow; Astou Ndiaye; Mame Dia; Modo Séne
- Cinematography: Georges Caristan
- Edited by: André Gaudier
- Music by: Fatou Casset; Kèba Faye
- Production company: Films Domirev
- Release date: 1964
- Running time: 29 minutes
- Country: Senegal
- Language: French

Niaye is a 1964 Senegalese short drama film directed by Ousmane Sembène. It is an adaptation of Vehi-Ciosane ou Blanche-Genèse.

== Plot summary ==
The pregnancy of a young girl scandalizes her community.

== Cast ==
- Sow as the Shoemaker
- Astou Ndiaye as the Griote
- Mame Dia as the Mother
- Modo Séne as the Soldier

== Production notes ==
The film was shot on 16 mm film with the participation of the inhabitants of the village of Keur Haly Sarrata.
