= Ceddo (film) =

1977 Senegalese drama film

- Directed by: Ousmane Sembène
- Written by: Ousmane Sembène
- Starring: Tabata Ndiaye; Moustapha Yade
- Cinematography: Georges Caristan
- Edited by: Florence Eymon
- Music by: Manu Dibango
- Production company: Film Doomi Reew
- Distributed by: New Yorker Films (1978) (USA)
- Release date: July 1977 (Berlinale)
- Running time: 120 minutes
- Country: Senegal
- Languages: French; Wolof

Ceddo (pronounced [ˈcɛd̺ˑɔ]), also known as The Outsiders, is a 1977 Senegalese drama film directed by Ousmane Sembène.

== Plot ==
The story takes place in Senegal, sometime after the establishment of a European presence in the area but before the imposition of direct French colonial administration. The Ceddo (the outsiders, or non-Muslims) try to preserve their animist traditional culture against Islam, Christianity, and the slave trade. When local king Demba War sides with the Muslims, the Ceddo abduct his daughter, Dior Yacine, to protest their forced conversion to Islam. Two members of the tribe try and fail to recapture the princess. Fearing their position is under threat, the local Imam inspires his Muslim followers to kill the king and the white Christian slave-traders. They convert the entire village to Islam by force, and manage to recapture the princess. When returning to the village, Dior Yacine rallies the ceddo against the Muslims, and kills the Imam who has usurped her father.

== Background ==
When questioned on what year the film takes place Ousmane said "I can't give a date. These events occurred in the 18th and 19th century and are still occurring". The story can be viewed as an abridged version of West-African history, and the village as a microcosm of the continent. For Sembène, the Ceddo embody the resistance of a culture and a traditional way of life to the encroachments of Islam, Christianity and colonialism. The director argued: "I believe today that Africans must get beyond the question of colour, they must recognise the problems which confront the whole world, as human beings like other human beings. If others undervalue us, that has no further significance for us. Africa must get beyond deriving everything from the European view. Africa must consider itself, recognise its problems and attempt to resolve them." He added "Often in Africa it's only the men who speak, but one forgets the role, interest of women. I think the princess is the incarnation of modern Africa ... There can be no development in Africa if women are left out of the account".

== Banning ==
Along with a number of Sembène's other films, Ceddo was banned in Senegal for its presentation of the conflicts between the Islamic and Christian religions and ethnic and traditional beliefs. According to another account reported in The New York Times in 1978, the banning was not "because of any religious sensitivity, but because Mr. Sembene insists on spelling 'ceddo' with two d's while the Senegalese Government insists it be spelled with one." Sembène had been a major supporter of the pioneering efforts to develop a system for the transcription of the Wolof language, and of the first Wolof-language publications, and spoke with contempt about President Léopold Sédar Senghor's knowledge of Wolof, or lack thereof. Senghor was a Serer, and in his language, unlike Wolof and other languages spoken in Senegal, consonants were not doubled.

Sembène also refused to make prints of the film available to agents of the Shah who had wanted to use it in Iran as a propaganda weapon against Ayatollah Khomeini.

== Release ==
It was entered into the 10th Moscow International Film Festival.

== See also ==
- Cinema of Senegal
- 1977 in film
