= Alassane Diago =

Senegalese film director

- Born: 31 March 1985 (age 41); Agnam Lidoubé, Senegal
- Education: studied Philosophy in Dakar
- Occupation: Filmmaker
- Known for: Les Larmes de l'émigration

Alassane Diago (born 31 March 1985) is a Senegalese filmmaker.

Alassane Diago was born on 31 March 1985 in Agnam Lidoubé, a village in northeast Senegal. He is of Fulani background. He studied Philosophy in Dakar.

== Career ==
In 2007, Diago was trained in audio-visual at the Media Centre of Dakar, after which he worked under the supervision of documentary maker Samba Félix N'diaye. He then took various internships in the Africadoc project in Saint-Louis, Senegal in 2008, 2009, and 2010.

== Work ==
Diago's first feature documentary, Les Larmes de l'émigration (Tears of emigration), won a prize at the Film Festival of Tarifa in 2010, as well as winning the Audience Award for Best Documentary at the International Francophone Film Festival of Namur.

== Filmography ==
Year	Film	Role	Notes
2004	Lili et le baobab	Assistant	
2010	Les Larmes de l'émigration (The Tears of emigration)	Director	78 minutes. Production: Les films de l'atelier (Sénégal), Corto Pacific (France), Diffusion TV Rennes 35 (France)
2012	Tristesse dans un bar et Dégoût à l’épicerie (Sadness in a bar and disgust at the grocery store)	Director	Short film
2012	La vie n'est pas immobile (Life isn't immobile)	Director	Production: quizas absl (Belgique), Corto Pacific, TV RENNES (France), Inzo Ya Bizizi (Congo)
2017	Tribunal du flueve (River tribunal)	Director	Feature film
2018	Rencontrer mon père (Meet my father)	Director	Documentary
