= New Yorker Films =

American independent film distribution company

New Yorker Films was an independent film distribution company founded by Daniel Talbot in 1965. It started as an extension of his Manhattan movie house, the New Yorker Theater, founded in 1960, after a film's producer would not allow for a movie's single booking. It went out of business in 2009 and was revived the next year with its acquisition by Aladdin Distribution, though it is no longer active as of 2024.

== Background ==
Through New Yorker Films, Talbot aimed to import foreign films that were not otherwise available in the US market. His first acquisition for distribution was the Bernardo Bertolucci debut film Before the Revolution (1964). Other early acquisitions, such as Jean-Luc Godard's Les Carabiniers (1963) and Ousmane Sembène's Black Girl (1966), helped establish New Yorker Films as a presenter of innovative, artistically significant, and politically engaged films from around the world.

== Titles introduced ==
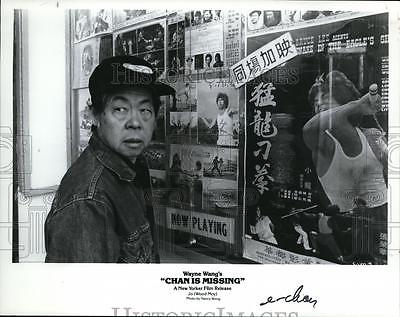
"Chan Is Missing", 1981

New Yorker Films helped gain an audience for controversial and challenging works avoided by other distributors in the United States. Some of these included Jacques Rivette's Celine and Julie Go Boating; Wayne Wang's Chan Is Missing; Chantal Akerman's Jeanne Dielman, 23 Quai du Commerce, 1080 Bruxelles; Claude Lanzmann's documentary Shoah; Emir Kusturica's Underground; the Merchant-Ivory docudrama The Courtesans of Bombay; Rainer Werner Fassbinder's The Marriage of Maria Braun; Werner Herzog's Aguirre, the Wrath of God; and Jean Eustache's The Mother and the Whore.

== Trends introduced ==
New Yorker Films considered itself the primary force in introducing the United States to New German Cinema, the politically embattled Latin American cinema, and the postcolonial African cinema. It discovered the early breakthrough works of such now-celebrated filmmakers as Agnieszka Holland, Juzo Itami, Errol Morris, Wayne Wang, and Zhang Yimou. Later it explored new frontiers in Iranian, Asian, and Eastern European cinema.

== Non-theatrical market ==
New Yorker Films also serviced the non-theatrical market, catering to the specialized needs of film society and classroom venues not generally served by larger film providers. The New Yorker Films library includes titles from leading independent and foreign film distributors such as Sony Pictures Classics, First Look, and Lions Gate Entertainment.

== Ownership by Madstone Films and Aladdin Distribution LLC ==
In 2002, New Yorker Films was acquired by Madstone Films. On February 23, 2009, New Yorker Films posted a notice on its Web site announcing it had gone out of business. An e-mail from company vice president José Lopez, published on the IndieWire news site, confirmed that the company's demise was the result of its parent company's defaulting on a loan.

In February 2010, a year after it ceased operations, it was announced that Aladdin Distribution LLC, headed by Christopher Harbonville and David Raphel, had acquired the company and its library. Former vice president José Lopez was named president, and New Yorker Films officially restarted operations on March 8, 2010. Since the revival, its acquisitions have included My Dog Tulip, Octubre, Turn Me On, Dammit!, and the re-release of Jacques Rivette's classic Celine and Julie Go Boating.

== End of the company ==
As of February 2018, the official company website NewYorkerFilms.com only has a placeholder image, and many of its DVDs have been out of print for at least a year.
