= Emitaï =

1971 film

- French poster
- Directed by: Ousmane Sembène
- Written by: Ousmane Sembène
- Starring: Robert Fontaine
- Cinematography: Michel Remaudeau
- Release date: July 1971
- Running time: 103 minutes
- Countries: France; Senegal
- Languages: Wolof; French

Emitaï ([ɛ.mi.ta.i], name of a Diola deity) is a 1971 Senegalese drama film directed by Ousmane Sembène. Set during World War II, it depicts the attempted revolt of the Diola people in Senegal by hiding their crops from being harvested by the government of Vichy France, while later resisting the oppression of the forces of Free France as the war continues.

== Plot ==
During World War II, the Vichy government conscripts men from France's colonies. A revolt breaks out in a Diola village where the women hide the rice crop harvest instead of submitting to the French tax. Diola leaders debate the best response to increasingly harsh French policies, and the situation becomes more urgent when the French and their colonial troops fire on Diola resisters. The Diola attempt to consult their gods, including the titular Emitaï, but the standoff with the French only intensifies. Soon, posters of Charles de Gaulle replace posters of Vichy's Marshal Pétain, reflecting the changing balance of power in French West Africa. This sudden political shift, however, does not change the situation at the village level, and colonial forces ultimately carry out a massacre of the Diola men.

== Cast ==
- Mbissine Thérèse Diop
- Andongo Diabon
- Michel Renaudeau as Lieutenant
- Robert Fontaine as Commandant
- Ousmane Camara
- Ibou Camara
- Abdoulaye Diallo
- Alphonse Diatta
- Pierre Blanchard as Colonel
- Cherif Tamba
- Fode Cambay
- Etienne Mané
- Joseph Diatta
- Dji Niassabaron
- Antio Bassene

== Title ==
Emitai derives its name from a Senegalese god, "who represents the passage from one stage of life to a new and better one".

== Release ==
Emitai was released in Senegal in 1971, and in 1972 in the United States. It was censored for five years in French-speaking Africa. The film was entered into the 7th Moscow International Film Festival where it won a Silver Prize.

== Reception ==
In his Family Guide to Movies on Video, Henry Herx wrote that "much of the story is told solely through its expressive images, and these visuals are the great strength of the movie". Metacritic, which uses a weighted average, assigned the film a score of 78 out of 100, based on 6 critics, indicating "generally favorable" reviews.

== See also ==
- Cinema of Senegal
- Senegalese Tirailleurs
