= Ousmane Sembène =

Senegalese film director, producer, screenwriter, actor and author (1923–2007)

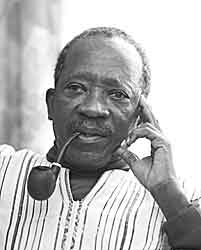
- Sembène in 1987
- Born: 1 January 1923; Ziguinchor, Casamance, French West Africa (now Senegal)
- Died: 9 June 2007 (aged 84); Dakar, Senegal
- Occupations: Film director, producer, screenwriter, actor, author
- Writing career
- Language: Wolof, French
- Years active: 1956–2003
- Notable works: Borom Sarret (1963); Black Girl (1966); Mandabi (1968)
- Military career
- Allegiance: Free France
- Branch: French Liberation Army; Senegalese Tirailleurs
- Service years: 1944-46
- Conflicts: World War II; Liberation of France
- Website: Official website

Ousmane Sembène (French: [usman sɑ̃bɛn]; 1 January 1923 or 8 January 1923 – 9 June 2007), was a Senegalese film director, producer and writer. The Los Angeles Times considered him one of the greatest authors of Africa and he has often been called the "father of African film".

He was often credited for his work in the French style as Sembène Ousmane, which he seemed to favor as a way to underscore the "colonial imposition" of this naming ritual and subvert it.

Descended from a Serer family through his mother from the line of Matar Sène, Ousmane Sembène was particularly drawn to Serer religious festivals. He especially was intrigued by the Tuur festival.

== Early life ==
The son of a fisherman and his wife, Ousmane Sembène was born in Ziguinchor in Casamance to a Lebou family. From childhood he was exposed to the Serer religion through his mother's people, especially the Tuur festival, in which he was made "cult servant". Although the Tuur demands offerings of curdled milk to the ancestral spirits (Pangool), Sembène did not take his responsibility as cult servant seriously and was known for drinking the offerings made to the ancestors. Some of his adult work draws on Serer themes. His maternal grandmother reared him and greatly influenced him. Women play a major role in his works.

Sembène's knowledge of French and basic Arabic besides Wolof, his mother tongue, followed his attendance at a madrasa, as was common for many Muslim boys, and a French school until 1936, when he clashed with the principal. Sembène worked with his father—he was prone to seasickness—until 1938. At the age of fifteen, he moved to Dakar, where he worked in a variety of manual labour jobs.

In 1944, during World War II and after the Fall of France, Sembène was drafted into the Senegalese Tirailleurs (a corps of the French Army). His later World War II service was with the Free French Forces. After the war, he returned to his home country. In 1947 he participated in a long railroad strike, on which he later based his seminal novel God's Bits of Wood (1960).

Late in 1947, Sembène stowed away to reach France, where he worked at a Citroën factory in Paris. He went south to work on the docks at Marseille, where he became active in the French trade union movement. He joined the communist-led CGT and the Communist party, helping to lead a strike to hinder shipment of weapons for the French colonial war in Vietnam. During this time, he discovered the Harlem Renaissance writer Claude McKay and the Haitian Marxist writer Jacques Roumain.

== Early literary career ==
Sembène taught himself to read and write in French. He drew on many of his life experiences in his debut novel, Le Docker Noir, written in French (1956, later published in English as The Black Docker). This was the story of Diaw, an African stevedore who faces racism and mistreatment on the docks at Marseille. Diaw writes a novel, which is later stolen by a white woman and published under her name. When he confronts her, he accidentally kills her. He is tried and executed in scenes highly reminiscent of Albert Camus's The Stranger (1942, also translated as The Outsider).

Though Sembène focuses particularly on the mistreatment of African immigrants, he also details the oppression of Arab and Spanish workers. He demonstrates that the issues concern xenophobia as much as they do race. This is written in a social realist mode, as was much of his subsequent fiction. His debut marked the beginning of Sembène's literary reputation. The success of this novel provided enough financial return for him to continue writing.

Sembène's second novel, O Pays, mon beau peuple! (Oh country, my beautiful people!, 1957), tells the story of Oumar. He is an ambitious black Senegalese farmer who returns to his native Casamance with a new white wife and ideas for modernizing the area's agricultural practices. Oumar struggles against both the French colonial government and the village social order, and he is eventually murdered. O Pays, mon beau peuple! was an international success, and Sembène received invitations from around the world, particularly from Communist countries such as China, Cuba, and the Soviet Union.

Sembène's third and most famous novel is Les Bouts de Bois de Dieu (God's Bits of Wood, 1960); most critics consider it his masterpiece, rivaled only by Xala. The novel is a fictional treatment of the railroad strike on the Dakar-Niger line, which lasted from 1947 to 1948. Although the charismatic and brilliant union spokesman, Ibrahima Bakayoko, is the most central figure, the novel has no true hero except the community itself. The people band together in the face of hardship and oppression to assert their rights. Accordingly, the novel features nearly fifty characters in both Senegal and neighboring Mali, showing the strike from all possible angles.

Sembène followed Les Bouts de Bois de Dieu with the short fiction collection Voltaïque (Tribal Scars, 1962). The collection contains short stories, tales, and fables, including "La Noire de..." which he would later adapt as his first film. In 1964, he released l'Harmattan (The Harmattan), an epic novel about a referendum for independence that takes place in an African capital.

From 1962 to 1963, Sembène studied filmmaking for a year at Gorky Film Studio, Moscow, under Soviet director Mark Donskoy. Also studying there was Sarah Maldoror, a French-Guadeloupean artist who became the first woman to make a feature film in Africa.

== Later literary career ==
With the 1965 publication of the novellas Le mandat, précédé de Vehi-Ciosane (The Money Order and White Genesis), Sembène's emphasis began to shift. Just as he had once attacked the racial and economic oppression conducted by the French colonial government, with these works he turned his attention to the corrupt African elites who followed during independence.

He was among the contributors to the magazine Lotus, which was launched in Cairo in 1968 and financed by Egypt and the Soviet Union.

Sembène continued this theme with the novel Xala (1973), the story of El Hadji Abdou Kader Beye, a rich businessman. On the very night of his wedding to his beautiful, young third wife, El Hadji suffers impotence ("xala" in Wolof), and believes it to be caused by a curse.

Le Dernier de l’empire (The Last of the Empire, 1981), Sembène's last novel, depicts corruption and an eventual military coup in a newly independent African nation. His paired 1987 novellas Niiwam et Taaw (Niiwam and Taaw) continue to explore social and moral collapse in urban Senegal.

On the strength of Les Bouts de Bois de Dieu and Xala, Sembène is considered one of the leading figures in African postcolonial literature. Samba Gadjigo notes that his influence reached audiences beyond francophone Africa: "Of Sembène's ten published literary works, seven have been translated into English".

== Film ==
As an author concerned with social change, Sembène wished to touch a wide audience. He realized that his written works would reach only the cultural elites, but that films were "the people's night school" and could reach a much broader African audience.

In 1963, Sembène produced his first film, a short called Borom Sarret (The Wagoner). In 1964 he made another short, entitled Niaye. In 1966 he produced his first feature film, La Noire de..., based on one of his own short stories; it was the first feature film ever released by a sub-Saharan African director. Though only 60 minutes long, the French-language film won the Prix Jean Vigo, bringing immediate international attention to both African film generally and Sembène specifically. Sembène followed this success with the 1968 Mandabi, achieving his dream of producing a film in his native Wolof language.

His later Wolof-language films include Xala (1975, based on his own novel), Ceddo (1977), Camp de Thiaroye (1987), and Guelwaar (1992). The Senegalese release of Ceddo was heavily censored, ostensibly for a problem with Sembène's paperwork, though some critics suggest that this censorship had more to do with the government's interpretation of what could be considered anti-Muslim content in the film.

Sembène resisted this action by distributing fliers at theaters describing the censored scenes, and he released the film uncut for the international market.

In 1971, Sembène also made a film in French and Diola, entitled Emitaï. It was entered in the 7th Moscow International Film Festival, where it won a Silver Prize. It was banned by governments throughout French West Africa. His 1975 film Xala was entered into the 9th Moscow International Film Festival.

In 1977 his film Ceddo was entered in the 10th Moscow International Film Festival. In the same year, Sembène was invited to be a member of the jury at the 27th Berlin International Film Festival. At the 11th Moscow International Film Festival in 1979, he was awarded the Honorable Prize for contribution to cinema.

Recurrent themes of Sembène's films are the history of colonialism, the failings of religion, the critique of the new African bourgeoisie, and the strength of African women.

His final film, the 2004 feature Moolaadé, won awards at the 2004 Cannes Film Festival and the FESPACO Film Festival in Ouagadougou, Burkina Faso. The film, set in a small African village in Burkina Faso, explored the controversial subject of female genital mutilation.

Sembène often makes a cameo appearance in his films. For example, in Mandabi he plays the letter writer at the post office.

== Death ==
Ousmane Sembène died on 9 June 2007, at the age of 84. He had been ill since December 2006, and died at his home in Dakar, Senegal, where he was buried in a shroud adorned with Quranic verses. Sembène was survived by three sons from two marriages.

Seipati Bulane Hopa, Secretary General of the Pan African Federation of Filmmakers (FEPACI), described Sembène as "a luminary that lit the torch for ordinary people to walk the path of light...a voice that spoke without hesitation, a man with an impeccable talent who unwaveringly held on to his artistic principles and did that with great integrity and dignity."

South Africa's Pallo Jordan, Minister of Arts and Culture, went further in eulogizing Sembène as "a well rounded intellectual and an exceptionally cultured humanist...an informed social critic [who] provided the world with an alternative knowledge of Africa."

== Works ==
=== Books ===
- Sembène, Ousmane (1956). Le Docker noir. Paris: Debresse. Also a new edition by publisher Présence Africaine of 2002.
  - Sembène, Ousmane (1987). Black Docker. African writers. London: Heinemann. ISBN 9780435908966. OCLC 16084389.
  - Sembène, Ousmane (1989). Black Docker. African writers. Oxford: Heinemann. ISBN 9780435908973. OCLC 476822988.
- Sembène, Ousmane (1957). O Pays, mon beau peuple!. Amiot Dumont, 1957. OCLC 1009422560.
- Sembène, Ousmane (1988). Les bouts de bois de Dieu : Banty mam yall. [Paris]: Le Livre Contemporain. OCLC 62109468. A later edition of the original of 1960.
  - Sembène, Ousmane (1995). God's Bits of Wood. Translated by Price, Francis. London: Heinemann. OCLC 562242510.
- Sembène, Ousmane (1962). Voltaïque. Paris: Présence Africaine. OCLC 312515053. Short stories.
  - Sembène, Ousmane (1974). Tribal Scars and other stories. Washington: INSCAPE. ISBN 9780879530150. OCLC 763705.
- Sembène, Ousmane (1964). L'Harmattan. Paris: Présence Africaine. OCLC 460661419. Reprint 1973.
- Sembène, Ousmane (1965). Vehi-Ciosane ou Blanche-Genèse, suivi du Mandat. Paris: Présence Africaine (Ligugé, impr. Aubin). OCLC 460661424.
  - Sembène, Ousmane (1987). The Money-Order with White Genesis. Translated by Wake, Clive. London: Heinemann. ISBN 9780435900922. OCLC 572500.
- Sembène, Ousmane (1973). Xala. Paris: Présence africaine.
  - Sembène, Ousmane (1976). Xala. OCLC 470084596.
  - Sembène, Ousmane (1980). Xala. London: Heinemann. ISBN 9780435901752. OCLC 974104373.
- Sembène, Ousmane (1981). Le dernier de l'Empire. Paris: L'Harmattan. ISBN 9782858021697. OCLC 405576233.
  - Sembène, Ousmane (1983). The Last of the Empire: a Senegalese novel. Translated by Adams, Adrian. London: Heinemann. ISBN 9780435902506. OCLC 10030343. "A Key to Senegalese Politics" – Werner Glinga.
- Sembène, Ousmane (1987). Niiwam : nouvelles. Paris: Présence africaine. ISBN 9782708704862. OCLC 631337297.
  - Sembène, Ousmane (1991). Niiwam and Taaw [two novellas]. Cape Town: D. Philip. ISBN 9780864861221. OCLC 24360778. Also Oxford and Portsmouth, N.H.: Heinemann, 1992.

=== Filmography ===
Sembène's films include:

Year	Film	Genre	Role	Duration (min)
1963	Borom Sarret	Drama short Portrait of a poor Senegalese man. First film made by a black African.	Director and writer	20 m
1964	Niaye	Drama short The scandal of a pregnant young girl	Director and writer	35 m
1966	Black Girl (original title: La noire de...)	Drama feature A Senegalese girl becomes a servant in France	Director and writer	65 m
1968	Mandabi	Drama feature A Senegalese man has to cope with a money order from Paris	Director and writer	92 m
1970	Tauw	Drama short A young man makes a home for his pregnant girlfriend	Director and writer	24 m
1971	Emitaï	Drama feature Jola people protest World War II French conscription	Director and writer	103 m
1975	Xala	Comedy feature A corrupt politician is cursed with impotence	Director and writer	123 m
1977	Ceddo	Drama feature In protest outsiders (Ceddo, non-muslims) kidnap a black princess	Director and co-writer with Carrie Sembene	120 m
1988	Camp de Thiaroye	Historical drama feature In the 1944 Thiaroye massacre French troops kill rebelling returned black soldiers	Co-director and co-writer with Thierno Faty Sow	147 m
1992	Guelwaar	Drama feature Religious and political satire on an erroneous burial	Director and writer	115 m
2000	Faat Kiné	Drama feature An unwed mother succeeds professionally	Director and writer	120 m
2004	Moolaadé	Drama feature Women protest female genital mutilation	Director and writer	124 m
