= FESTAC 77 =

1977 international festival in Lagos, Nigeria

Festac '77 festival
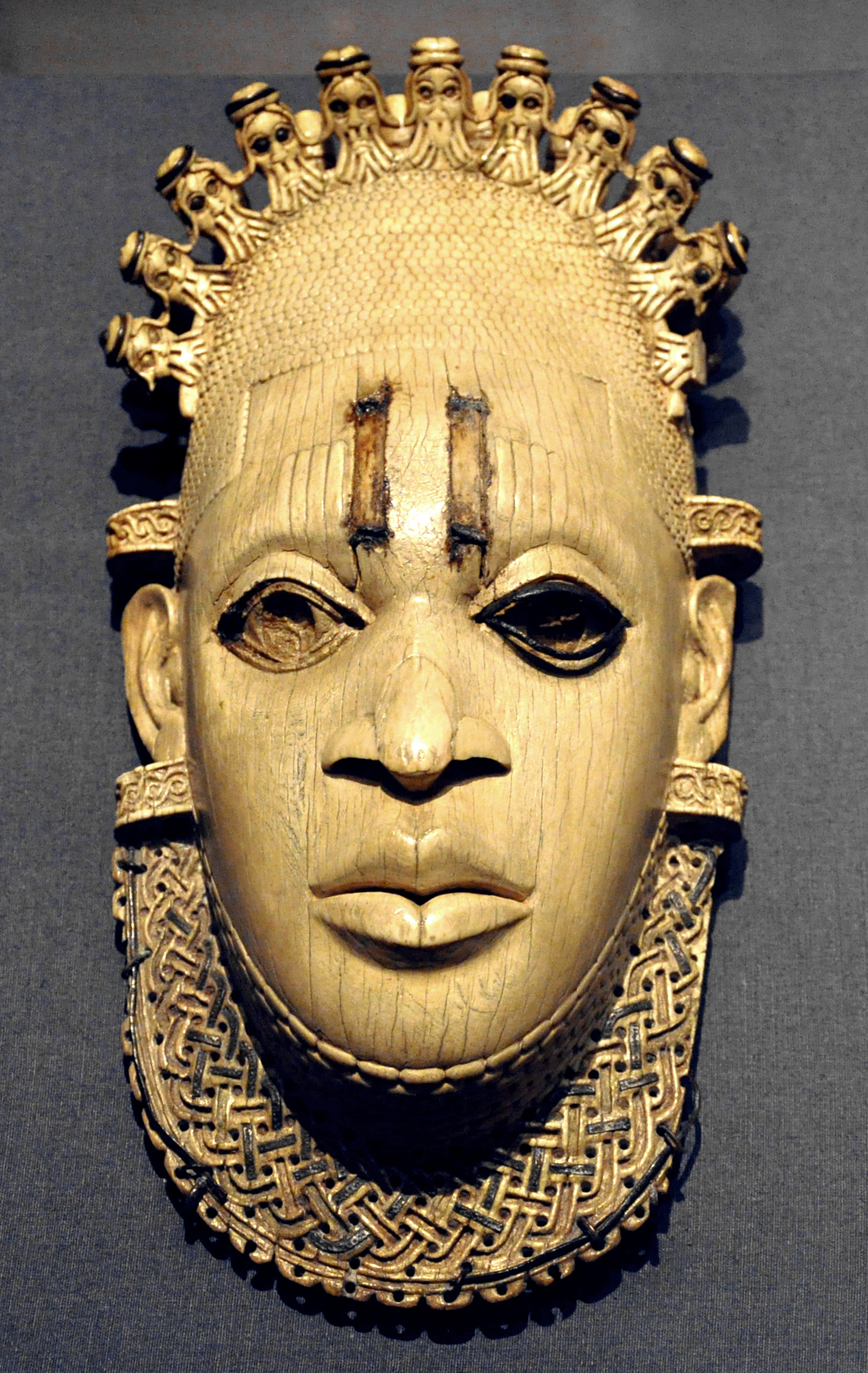
- A replica of this ivory mask was used as a symbol for Festac '77.
- Language: English

Origin
- Meaning: Pan Africanism
- Region of origin: Nigeria

Festac '77, also known as the Second World Black and African Festival of Arts and Culture (the first festival took place in Dakar in April 1966, the second in Algiers in July 1969) was a major international festival held in Lagos, Nigeria, from 15 January 1977 to 12 February 1977. The month-long event celebrated African culture and showcased African music, fine art, literature, drama, dance and religion to the world. Around 16,000 participants, representing 56 African nations and countries of the African Diaspora, performed at the event. Music artists who performed at the festival included Stevie Wonder from the United States, Gilberto Gil from Brazil, Bembeya Jazz National from Guinea, Mighty Sparrow from Trinidad and Tobago, Les Ballets Africains, South African singer Miriam Makeba, Congolese Franco Luambo Makiadi, and Liberian singer Yatta Zoe. At the time it was held, it was the largest pan-African gathering to ever take place. The event attracted around 500,000 spectators.

The official emblem of the festival was a replica royal ivory mask. The mask was crafted by Erhabor Emokpae of Benin. The hosting of the festival led to the establishment of the Nigerian National Council of Arts and Culture, Festac Village and the National Theatre, Iganmu, Lagos. A majority of the events were held in four main venues: the National Theatre, National Stadium, Surulere, Lagos City Hall and Tafawa Balewa Square.

== Preparation ==
=== Background ===
The inspiration for convening FESTAC can be traced to the development of ideas on Négritude and Pan-Africanism. In the 1940s, Aimé Césaire and Léopold Sédar Senghor, inspired by the Pan-Africanism of W. E. B. Du Bois and Alain Locke's concept of the New Negro, started a journal and publishing house in Paris, France, called Présence Africaine; both Césaire and Senghor were also members of the Société africaine de culture. Présence Africaine and the Society of African Culture were facilitators of two congresses, one in 1956 and the other in 1959. The forums were convened with the intention of promoting black culture and civilisation. The first congress held was the Conference of Black Writers in Paris and the second was a black writers forum in Rome, Italy. Attendees of the forums included writers of African and Afro-descendant heritage such as Alioune Diop, Cheikh Anta Diop, Léopold Senghor, and Jacques Rabemananjara, Richard Wright, Césaire, George Lamming, Horace Mann Bond, Jacques Alexis, John Davis, William Fontaine, Jean Price Mars, James Baldwin, Chester Himes, Mercer Cook and Frantz Fanon. Members of both forums were engaged with discussing ideas about the resurgence of African culture and the convocation of a festival of arts.

In 1966, with leadership provided by Senghor and subsidies from outside, notably France, and UNESCO, the First World Festival of Black Arts was held in Dakar, Senegal, 1–24 April 1966. At the end of the first festival, Nigeria was invited to hold the second festival in 1970 so as to promote a continuation of black unity through cultural festivals. The host nation would be responsible for providing the necessary infrastructure and facilities for a successful staging of the festival. However, a Civil War and changes in government led to the postponing of the festival to 1977.

Preparation for a second festival began in Lagos, Nigeria, on 3 October 1972, when the International Festival Committee met for the first time and decided that the festival would be held in November 1974. The name of the festival was changed from "World Black Festival of Arts and Culture" to "Second World Black and African Festival of Arts and Culture" so as to accommodate the realities of African unity. The date was further changed to November 1975. The organizers divided countries into 16 geographical zones, with each zone having a committee made up of representatives of peoples of African descent; the chairman for each zone would become a member of the International Festival Committee. The committee acted as the administrative arm of the Festival. The desire to improve on the Dakar festival led to Nigeria's intention to create an extravagant show fueled by new-found oil money. A new regime replaced the Gowon administration and the date for the festival was thus changed to 1977.

To generate publicity for the festival, the international committee advised the zones to encourage preliminary festivals. Some mini-festivals did take place, such as Carifesta hosted by Guyana, the Commonwealth Festival in London, Ghana's national exhibition of arts and crafts and Nigeria's Nafest. The festival committee also chose as the festival emblem a replica by Erhabor Emokpae of the 15th-century Benin ivory mask (the mask itself was last worn by Ovonramwen, a Benin king dethroned in 1897 by the Consul General of the Niger Coast Protectorate, Ralph Moor).

=== Facilities ===
A housing estate known as Festac Village was constructed as accommodation for about 17,000 participants. However, the long-term objective of the village under the Federal Housing Programme was to relieve some of the housing pressure in Lagos. The housing estate was proposed for construction within two years, with more than 40 contractors working on different sites of the project. In total 5,088 dwelling units were built prior to the festival and an additional 5,687 were to be completed by the end of 1977. During the festival, the housing estate was the venue for performance rehearsals and interaction by participants as various troupes rehearsed their routines in the day and at night.

For hosting the performances and lectures, a state-of-the-art multipurpose theatre was built, to serve also as a lasting centre of African art and culture. The theatre's design was based on the Palace of Culture and Sports in Varna, Bulgaria, and was constructed by the Bulgarian state firm Technoexportstroy. The new complex had two exhibition halls, a 5,000-capacity performance and event hall, a conference hall with 1,600 seats and two cinema halls. The theatre hosted dance, music, art exhibitions, cinema, drama and the colloquium.

=== Aims of the Festival ===
- To ensure the revival, resurgence, propagation and promotion of Black and African culture and black and African cultural values and civilization;
- To present black and African culture in its highest and widest conception;
- To bring to light the diverse contributions of black and African peoples to the universal currents of thought and arts;
- To promote black and African artists, performers and writers and facilitate their world acceptance and their access to world outlets;
- To promote better international and interracial understanding;
- To facilitate a periodic return to origin in Africa by black artists, writers and performers uprooted to other continents.

== The Festival ==
The opening ceremony of the festival took place on 15 January 1977 inside the National Stadium, Surulere, Lagos. One of the highlights of the ceremony was a parade of participants representing 48 countries, marching past visiting dignitaries, diplomats and the Nigerian Head of State, Olusegun Obasanjo. Some participants in the parade wore colourful ceremonial robes, some men were on 14-foot stilts, and Nigerian dancers carried flaming urns on their heads. To symbolize the freedom and unity of Black peoples 1,000 pigeons were released; a shango priest also set the festival bowl aflame.

The festival events began around 9 a.m. each day and lasted till midnight.

=== Colloquium ===
The colloquium was at the heart of the festival, and was held daily during first two weeks of activities. About 700 writers, artists and scholars participated in the lectures. The theme of the lectures bordered on the lack of intellectual freedom and the ambivalence experienced by Third World countries that sometimes turn to their colonizers for expertise while attempting to establish an image of confidence and independence to themselves as well as the rest of the world. The declared purpose of the colloquium was to seek answers to the questions of how to revive and foster black and African artists and how to facilitate international acceptance and access to outlets.

Among the speakers at events were Clarival do Prado Valladares, Lazarus Ekwueme, Babs Fafunwa and Eileen Southern.

=== Durbar and regatta festivals ===
The festival committee purchased a total of 2,003 45-seater luxury buses and 91 26-seater buses for logistics reasons. One reason was the Durbar festival that was staged in Kaduna, a city that is more than 700 kilometers from Lagos. The event took place from 5 February to 8 February 1977 . Originally, durbars in Nigeria were receptions held in honour of princes; beginning in 1911, four durbars had been held in Nigeria prior to 1977. However, the Festac durbar was a pageant that had emirs riding with their entourage of cavalry, camels, and entertainers as a sign of unity. The durbar was a display of horsemen and entertainers such as musicians playing horns, Kakakitrumpets, the tambari and drums, among the entourage were Fulani, Bori and Bida masqueraders. The Festac durbar appropriated from ancient Hausa, Songhay and Kanembu customs such as Hawan Dawaki, also known as the mounting of horses, and a Bornu military ceremony called Tewur, which is a rally held by cavalry men before a major campaign. Another historic event appropriated was the annual meetings of Fulani emirs held at the instance of the Caliphs of Sokoto in Kaura Namoda to mobilize contingents for expeditions against hostile states.

The boat regatta was another event staged far from the common venues but, unlike the durbar, the regatta was staged in Lagos. The regatta was a three-day event performed at Queen's Drive foreshore in Ikoyi, Lagos. Participants were principally from Nigeria, and the states represented were Edo, Cross River, Imo, Kwara, Ogun, Ondo and Lagos states. Each boat had an assemble of musicians, acrobats or masquerades and dancers. More than 200 boats were involved in the event.

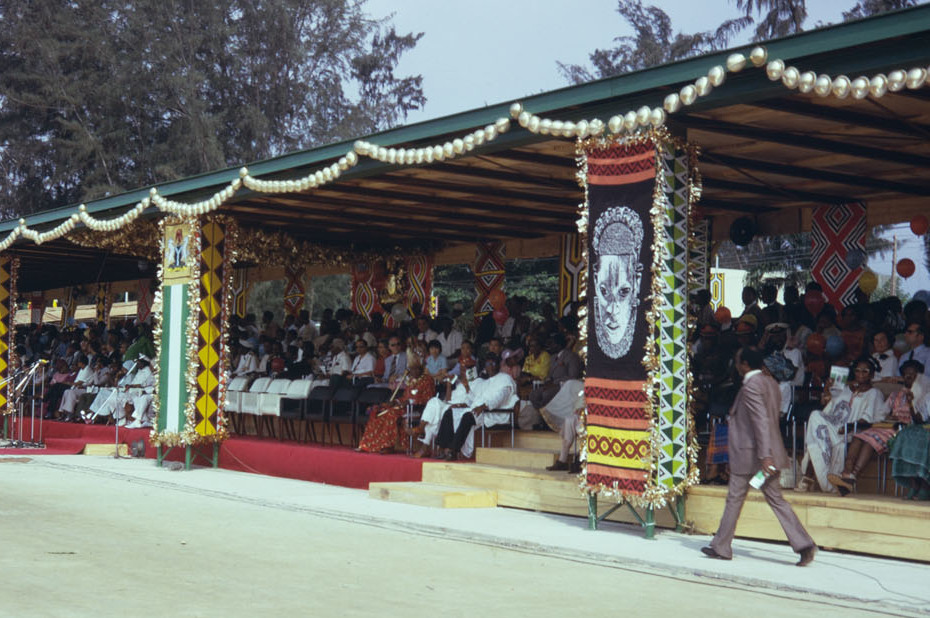
Grand Durbar in Kaduna State

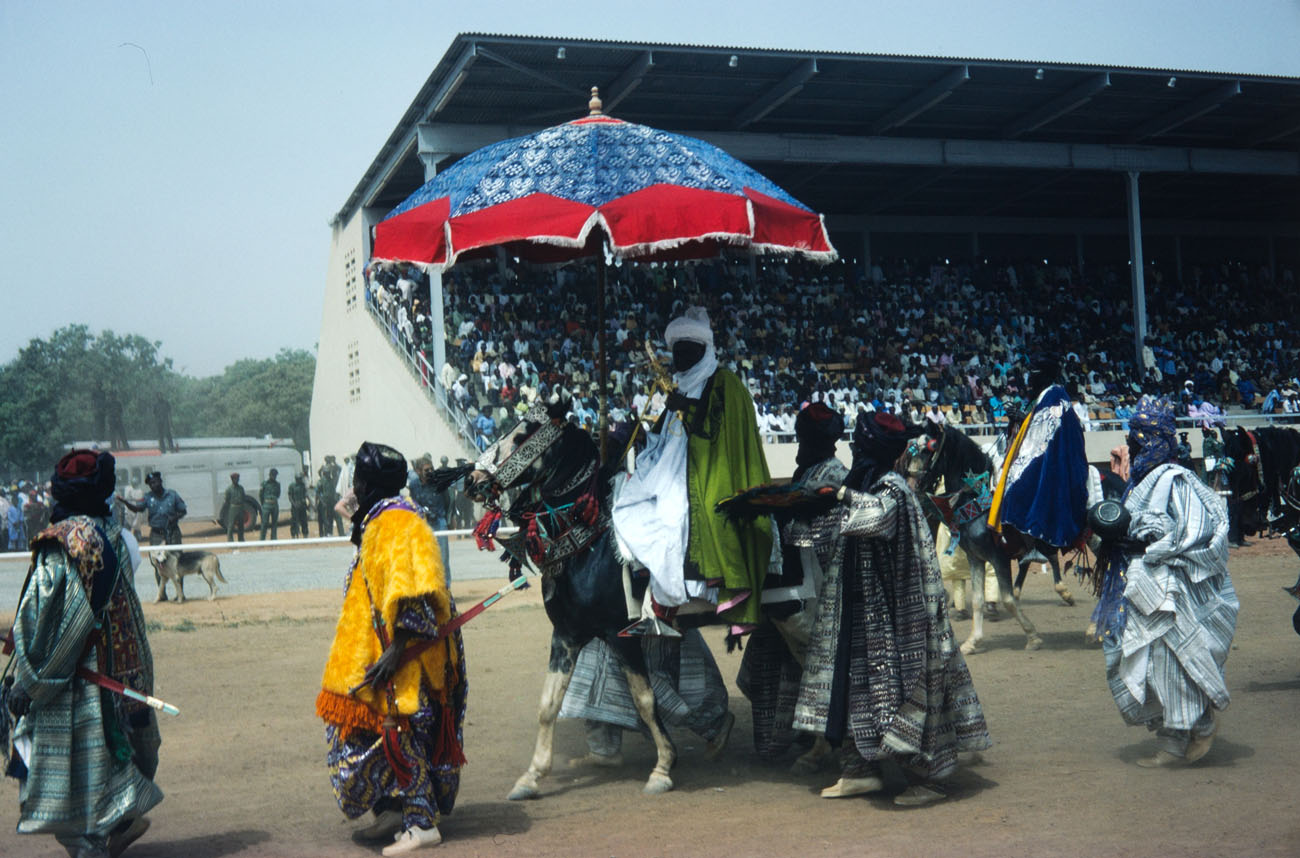
Grand Durbar in Kaduna State

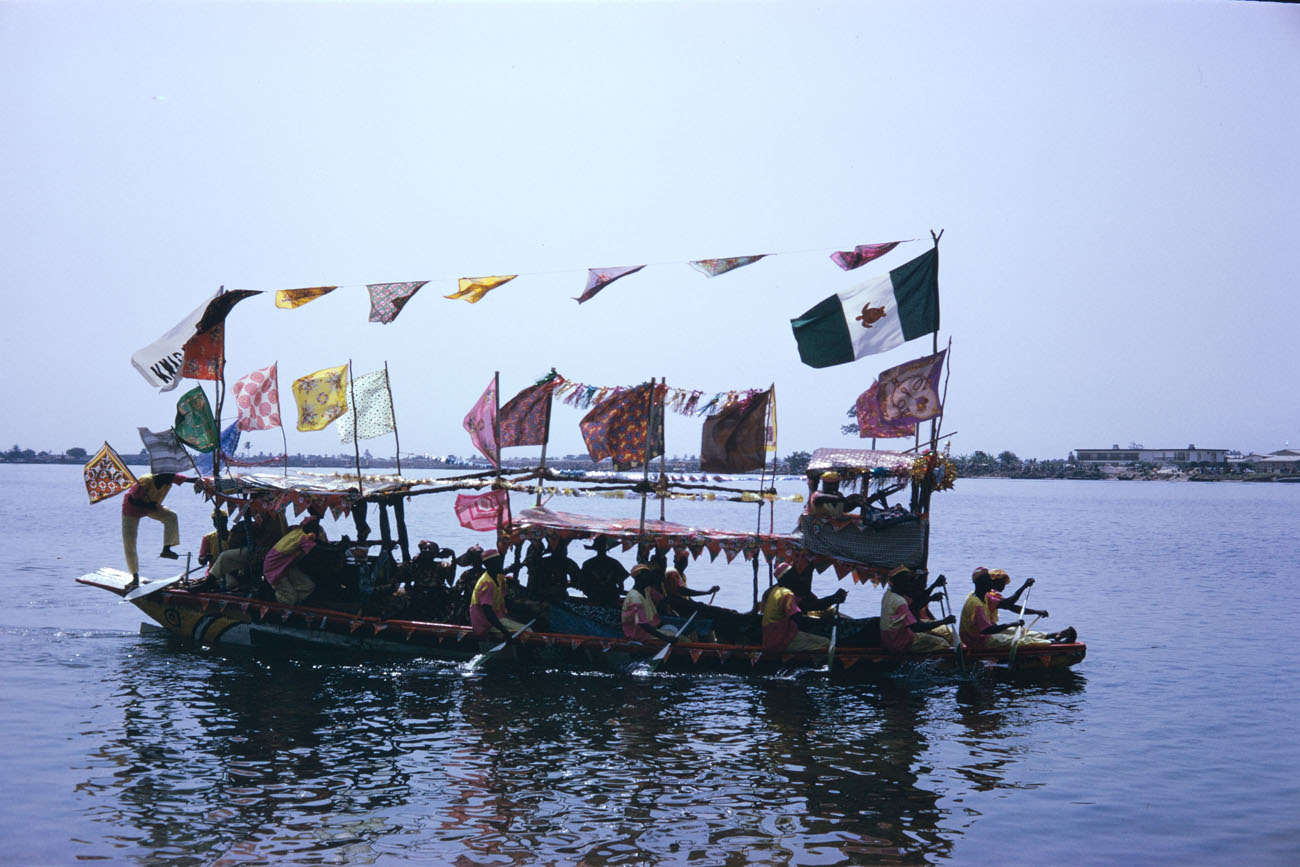
Regatta in Lagos

=== Visual and performing arts ===
Performing and visual art shows such as film, drama, music and dance were mostly staged during late afternoons and evenings at the National Theatre, however, some drama and music shows were also staged at Tafawa Balewa Square, with modern drama and music shows usually staged in the afternoons and traditional drama and music shows staged in the evenings. In total, about 50 plays, 150 music and dance shows, 80 films, 40 art exhibitions and 200 poetry and dance sessions were staged. On the eve of the inaugural ceremonies, Sory Kandia Kouyaté, a master Mande Griot, treated the heads of state and government to a stellar vocal and kora performance, reminiscent. The settings was reminiscent of Medieval Africa's imperial and royal courts.

Other musicians who performed were Osibisa, Les Amazones, Bembeya Jazz and Les Ballets Africains from Guinea; Franco Luambo from Congo; Miriam Makeba, Louis Moholo, Dudu Pukwana from South Africa; the Invaders Steelband from Guyana, and the Mighty Sparrow from Grenada; Gilberto Gil from Brazil, and US artists such as Donald Byrd, Randy Weston, Stevie Wonder and Sun Ra.

Apart from numerous concerts, a music meeting was held on 29 January 1977 under the leadership of composer Akin Euba. Also participating at the meeting were Mwesa Isaiah Mapoma, Kwabena Nketia and Mosunmola Omibiyi. Others present included instrumentalists, singers, public school teachers and graduate students of music. For more than two hours, the participants discussed matters of mutual concern and explored ways of improving musical activities among Africans, both on the continent and in the Diaspora.

An Indigenous Australian dance troupe, the Aboriginal Islander Dance Theatre, as well as the Eleo Pomare Dance Company from New York City, performed at the festival.

Several art exhibitions took place at the National Theatre, the Nigerian National Museum and around Tafawa Balewa Square. At the Square, each country represented at the festival was given a booth to exhibit their paintings, musical instruments, woven cloths, books and art objects. Some other notable exhibitions that took place were Africa and the Origin of Man, which was held at the National Theatre, and Ekpo Eyo's 2000 Years of Nigerian Art, which included Nok terracottas, Benin court art, Igbo Ukwu, Ife and Tsoede bronzes and art objects. A contemporary Nigerian exhibit featuring works from Bruce Onobrakpeya, Ben Enwonwu, Yusuf Grillo, Uche Okeke and Kolade Oshinowo was also part of the event. A display of African architectural technology also took place at the National Theatre, where the display included paintings, drawings, and models showing different architectural themes such as banco masonry structures, tensile structure and the Berber Courtyard of Matmata.

== Aftermath and legacy ==
In the years after FESTAC '77, the National Theatre lost traction as the main venue for theatrical activities for a number of reasons. Nigeria's capital shifted from Lagos to Abuja in 1991 which led to a depletion in funding for the maintenance for the National Theatre. Other venues had been built in Lagos, which directed attention away from the National Theatre. With no productions happening regularly enough to warrant usage of theatre, there existed a lot of uncertainty in how to keep it both operating and maintained. From 1975 to 1990, the Ministry of Culture and Social Welfare moved in and used it as an administrative office.

By 1991, the National Theatre had come to fall into disrepair. A crack arose in the roof of the auditorium, and spread throughout the building; this let in water, which eventually caused irreversible damage to the equipment and floors. Power was then cut from the building, for it was deemed a safety hazard.

=== Recent works discussing FESTAC '77 ===
The 2019 book FESTAC '77: The 2nd World Black and African Festival of Arts and Culture featured photographic and archival materials, interviews and new writing, with words and work by such festival participants as Wole Soyinka, Léopold Sédar Senghor, Ahmed Sékou Touré, Archie Shepp, Miriam Makeba, Alioune Diop, Jeff Donaldson, Louis Farrakhan, Stevie Wonder, Abdias do Nascimento, Keorapetse Kgositsile, Mario de Andrade, Ted Joans, Carlos Moore, Ayi Kwei Armah, Ama Ata Aidoo, Johnny Dyani, Werewere Liking, Marilyn Nance, Barkley Hendricks, Mildred Thompson, Ibrahim El-Salahi, Jayne Cortez, Atukwei Okai, Jonas Gwangwa, Lindsay Barrett, Gilberto de la Nuez, and Sun Ra, among others.

The archive of the USA contingent's participation is owned and maintained by photographer Marilyn Nance, the official photographer for FESTAC 77's North American Zone (NAZ). As a two-time finalist for the W. Eugene Smith Award in Humanistic Photography, Nance is most well known for her complete documentation of FESTAC '77. In October 2022, Nance published a book of rarely seen photographs from FESTAC '77, Last Day In Lagos. The book garnered accolades in The New York Times and The New Yorker, among other journals.

An exhibition curated by Theaster Gates and Romi Crawford featured a wealth of photographs, some never publicly seen, from Chicago-based photographer Karega Kofi Moyo. The exhibition, K. Kofi Moyo and FESTAC ’77: The Activation of a Black Archive, was on view at the University of Chicago's Logan Center for the Arts exhibition gallery February 12 – March 21, 2021. The exhibition grew from the research conducted during a Richard and Mary L. Gray Center Mellon Fellowship by Gates and Crawford.

== See also ==
- World Festival of Black Arts
- Congress of Black Writers and Artists
