= Mwesa =

Mwesa may be,

- Mwesa language, Gabon
- Mwesa Isaiah Mapoma
