= Marilyn Nance =

American artist

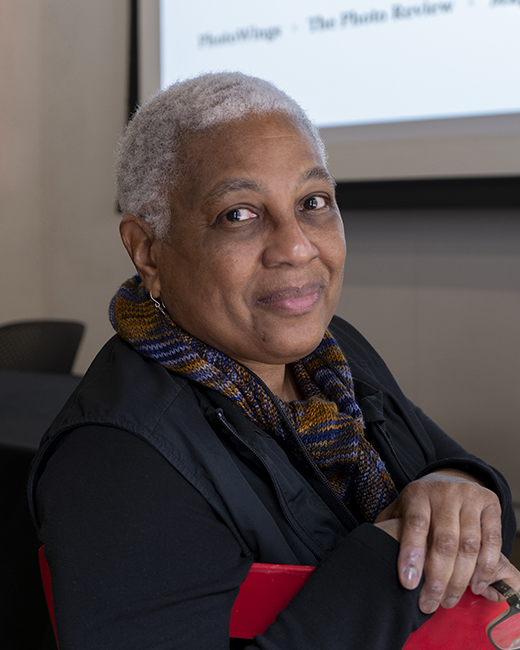
- Nance in 2026
- Born: November 12, 1953 (age 72); New York City
- Other names: Soulsista
- Education: New York University; Pratt Institute; Maryland Institute College of Art
- Known for: Photography; Digital Art; Photojournalism; Mixed-media; Archiving; Licensing; Copyright
- Website: www.marilynnance.com

Marilyn Nance (born November 12, 1953), also known as Soulsista, is an American multimedia artist known for work focusing on exploring human connections, African-American spirituality, and the use of technology in storytelling.

Nance's photojournalism has been published in Life, The Village Voice, The New York Times, Essence, and Newsday, and her work is in the permanent collections of the Smithsonian American Art Museum, the Library of Congress, Schomburg Center for Research in Black Culture, the Brooklyn Museum, and the Museum of Fine Arts Houston. Nance's book is the photographic archive of the FESTAC '77 Second World Black and African Festival of Arts and Culture, Last Day in Lagos (202e).

== Early life and education ==
Marilyn Nance was born in New York City on November 12, 1953, and grew up in Brooklyn.

Nance began photographing as a child and attended the Bronx High School of Science from 1968 to 1971, New York University from 1971 to 1972, studying journalism, before earning a Bachelor of Fine Arts degree in communications graphic design from Pratt Institute in 1976. She earned a Masters of Fine Arts from Maryland Institute College of Art in 1996 and graduated from New York University's Interactive Telecommunications Program (ITP) in 1998.

== Career ==
While still a student at Pratt, Nance photographed members of her family in Pratt City, Alabama, a Black suburb of Birmingham. She declared herself a photographer after having worked in the photo studio of Pratt Institute's Office of Public Relations under the direction of Alan Newman while also still a student. After the studio closed in 1974, Nance was able to freelance for The Village Voice. Her body of work focused on African American spiritual culture: She made images of members of churches in Brooklyn and Harlem and the first Black church in America.

In 1977, Nance was the official photographer for the North American Zone of FESTAC '77, the Second World Black and African Festival of Arts and Culture, a Pan-African international festival held in Lagos, Nigeria, which took place from January 15 to February 12, 1977. The festival centered around the themes, "Revival, resurgence, propagation, and protection of black and African cultural values and civilization," and the North American delegation included Betye Saar, Faith Ringgold, Barkley Hendricks, Stevie Wonder and Sun Ra, and the writers Louise Meriwether and Audre Lorde. Over the course of the month-long event, her first trip outside of the U.S., she amassed 1,500 images representing one of the most complete photographic records of this major event. Nance photographed both delegates and the festival spectators. In her 2022 book about the event, she described FESTAC as "the Olympics, plus a Biennial, plus Woodstock."

After FESTAC, Nance continued photographing Black culture, the Black Indians of New Orleans, Oyotunji African Village in Sheldon, South Carolina, and carnivals in Rio de Janeiro.

Nance was an artist-in-residence at the Studio Museum in New York City from 1993 to 1994. She concluded her residency by presenting an installation, Egungun Work, inspired by a Yoruba festival she attended while photographing the Oyotunji African Village in Sheldon SC in 1981. It contained banners, church fans and pews, a notebook of her brief comments on the photos, and also presented Nance's contact sheets and magnifying glasses, by which viewers could "edit" the work. The work was reviewed favorably by the New York Times, described as "moving" and a piece in which the "ends and means are superbly matched."

In 1995, Nance became a digital pioneer, developing her soulsista.com website. In 1997, she developed a web app prototyping Ifá (Yoruba) divination, and in 1999 she curated a digital project for the New York Public Library's Schomburg Center for Research in Black Culture, putting online more than 500 images of nineteenth-century African Americans to accompany texts written by African American women writers of that time. Nance went on to become a technology specialist in the New York City public school system, helping teachers and their students use technology as a tool for lifelong learning.

Nance gave a lecture on her work to the Library of Congress in 2004. In 2016, she digitized and printed all her images from FESTAC '77.

Nance's book about FESTAC '77, Last Day in Lagos (2022), was hailed as a significant cultural document by The New York Times, and The New Yorker where Julian Lucas described it as "a stunning yearbook of the Black world that is sure to induce envy even in those who weren't alive in 1977." In 2023, Marilyn Nance was a lecturer for the Scholl Lecture Series at the Pérez Art Museum Miami, Florida, to comment and expand on her publication Last Day in Lagos.

== Publications ==
- Rosenblum, Naomi, A World History of Photography (New York: Abbeville, 1997, 1989, 2007, 2019)
- Rosenblum, Naomi, A History of Women Photographers, (New York: Abbeville, 1994, 2001, 2010)
- Last Day in Lagos. By Nance. CARA/Fourthwall, 2022. Edited by Oluremi C. Onabanjo. With a foreword by Julie Mehretu, three essays and Onabanjo's interview of Nance.

== Group exhibitions ==
- Pleasures and Terrors of Domestic Comfort, Museum of Modern Art, New York, 1991
- African American Art: Harlem Renaissance, Civil Rights Era, and Beyond, Smithsonian, 2012, online
- Photography and the Black Arts Movement, 1955–1985, National Gallery of Art, 2025

== Awards ==
- 1987: New York State Council on the Arts Grant
- 1989: New York Foundation for the Arts fellowship for photography
- 1991: Finalist, W. Eugene Smith Award in Humanistic Photography, for her body of work on African American spirituality
- 1993: New York Foundation for the Arts fellowship for non-fiction literature
- 1993: Finalist, W. Eugene Smith Award in Humanistic Photography, for her body of work on African American spirituality
- 2000: New York Foundation for the Arts fellowship for photography
- 2024: Honorary Fellowship, The Royal Photographic Society

== Collections ==
- Smithsonian Institution's Smithsonian American Art Museum
- The Library of Congress's Prints & Photographs Division holds some of her work from the 1970s and 1980s.
- Schomburg Center for Research in Black Culture's Preservation of the Black Religious Heritage
- Museum of Fine Arts Houston
- Brooklyn Museum
