= Kolade =

- Gender: Male
- Language: Yoruba

Origin
- Origin: Nigeria
- Meaning: Bring lots of honor
- Region of origin: Southwestern Nigeria

Kọ́ládé is a male-given Yoruba name commonly used as a surname in Nigeria. It means "Bring lots of honors". Other full forms of the name include Adékọ́ládé (The crown has gathered and brought honor.), Akọ́ládé (One who brings success.), Ifákọ́ladé/Fákọ́ladé (Ifa arrives with wealth.) Díẹ̀kọ́ladé (Royalty isn't inconsequential. The crown isn’t to be taken lightly.) etc.

== Given name ==
- Kolade Victor Akinjo (born 1972), Nigerian politician
- David Ayomide Kolade Kasumu (born 1999), English footballer
- Kolade Dominate Olowu (born 1992), Nigerian radio personality
- Kolade Oshinowo (born 1948), Nigerian painter

== Surname ==
- Christopher Kolade (1932–2025), Nigerian diplomat and activist
