= Les Amazones de Guinée =

Guinean musical group

Les Amazones de Guinée (The Amazons of Guinea) are a Guinean all-woman musical group. The band's members are all female militia soldiers in Guinea.

After Guinea gained independence from France in 1958, the country's first president, Sékou Touré, announced a cultural policy of authenticité. As part of this state-sponsored effort to promote traditional West African music, the band was formed in 1961 as L'Orchestre Féminin De La Gendarmerie De Guinée. They were later renamed the Amazons of Guinea, to increase their international appeal. They won wider international attention after appearing at FESTAC 77 in Lagos alongside Stevie Wonder, Sun Ra, Donald Byrd, Gilberto Gil and Miriam Makeba.

Led by bassist Commandant Salematou Diallo, Les Amazones de Guinée combine jazz and traditional West African guitar music. When originally formed, their music was Cuban-influenced and acoustic, based around strings, bongos and congas. As the 1960s progressed, they moved to incorporate electric guitars, drum-kits and brass. The fifteen band members include lead guitarist Yaya Kouyate and rhythm guitarist N'sira Tounkara. The band recorded their first album, Au Coeur de Paris, in Paris in 1982. Their second album, Wamato, appeared in 2008. Their pioneering sound and story inspired Les Amazones D’Afrique, a mostly Malian female supergroup dedicated to political and feminist activism.

== Albums ==
- Au coeur de Paris and M'Mah Sylla, 1982
- Wamato, 2008
