= Alioune Diop =

Senegalese writer and editor (1910–1980)

- Born: 10 January 1910; Saint-Louis, French West Africa (now Senegal)
- Died: 2 May 1980 (aged 70); Paris, France
- Occupations: Writer and editor

Alioune Diop (10 January 1910 – 2 May 1980) was a Senegalese writer and editor, founder of the intellectual journal Présence africaine, and a central figure in the Négritude movement.

== Early life ==
Born a Muslim in Saint-Louis, Senegal, French West Africa, Diop attended a koranic school but his aunts also taught him to read the Bible. As an adult, Alioune Diop converted to Christianity and received his Catholic baptism from Dominican Father Jean-Augustin Maydieu on Christmas Eve 1944 in Saint-Flour in Cantal (France) under the name of Jean. After receiving his secondary education at the Lycée Faidherbe in Saint-Louis, Senegal, he continued his studies in Algeria and at the Sorbonne in Paris, where he went in 1937. He took a position as professor of classical literature in Paris and after World War II represented Senegal in the French senate, to which he was elected in 1946.

== Career ==
In 1947, he founded in Paris the influential journal Présence africaine, to promote African cultural identity and the liberation of peoples of Africa and the African diaspora. This was followed by the establishment of Présence Africaine Editions, which became a leading publishing house for African authors.

Aside from his publishing initiatives, he was a key figure in many anti-colonial and African cultural interventions. He founded the Société Africaine de Culture in 1956 and that same year was principal organizer of the first international Congress of Black Writers and Artists, held in Paris, which attracted artists and writers from across the world, including Pablo Picasso and Claude Lévi-Strauss. In 1966, together with Léopold Sédar Senghor he organized the first World Festival of Negro Arts in Dakar (1^{er} Festival mondial des Arts nègres, also called FESMAN); among its many participants were Josephine Baker, Aimé Césaire, Duke Ellington, Langston Hughes and André Malraux).

Diop had an important role in the Second Vatican Council as an African Catholic and was a friend of Popes John XXIII and Paul VI.

On the occasion of the preparation of the Second Vatican Council, Alioune Diop mobilized, within the Société africaine de culture, Catholic intellectuals, priests and laity, for the meeting in Rome which took place from 26 to 27 May 1962, on the theme "African personality and Catholicism".

After the declaration of Paul VI in Kampala ("You can and must have an African Christianity"), the SAC gave Alioune Diop (together with the Cameroonian layman Georges Ngango) the mission of obtaining from the pope the authorization to organize "the general states of African Christianity".

== Death ==
Diop died in Paris, aged 70, on 2 May 1980. His funeral took place in the Saint-Médard Church in Paris on the same day and he was buried in the Catholic cemetery of Bel-Air (in Dakar).

== Legacy ==
A literary prize in his honour, the Prix International Alioune Diop, was established in 1982.
