= M'Mah Sylla =

Guinean singer

- Born: May 1958; Guinea
- Occupation: Singer

M'Mah Sylla (born May 1958) is a Guinean singer.

M'Mah Sylla was born in May 1958 in Guinea. She got her start singing with the Dirou Band. She became a member of the long-standing musical group Les Amazones de Guinée, whose members are all active female members of Guinea's militia and police. She released an album with the group, Au coeur de Paris and M’mah Sylla (1983), which brought the group international attention.

She released her first solo album in 1985, La Rossignol de Guinee. An acoustic album, critic Ronnie Graham called it "a landmark in contemporary African music." She also released an album with another member of Les Amazones, Sona Diabaté, called Sahel (1988) on the Triple Earth label. Sylla also appears as a vocalist on Les Amazones' 2008 album, Wamato.

== Discography ==
- Les Amazones de Guinée, Au coeur de Paris and M’mah Sylla. Syliphone SLP 76, 1983.
- M'Mah Sylla, La Rossignol de Guinee, Syliphone SLP 78, 1985.
- M'Mah Sylla, and Sona Diabaté, Sahel, Triple Earth Terra 106, 1988
- Les Amazones de Guinee, Wamato (Sterns STCD 1106), 2008.
