= Lafargue Rigaud =

Haitian portrait painter (born 1847)

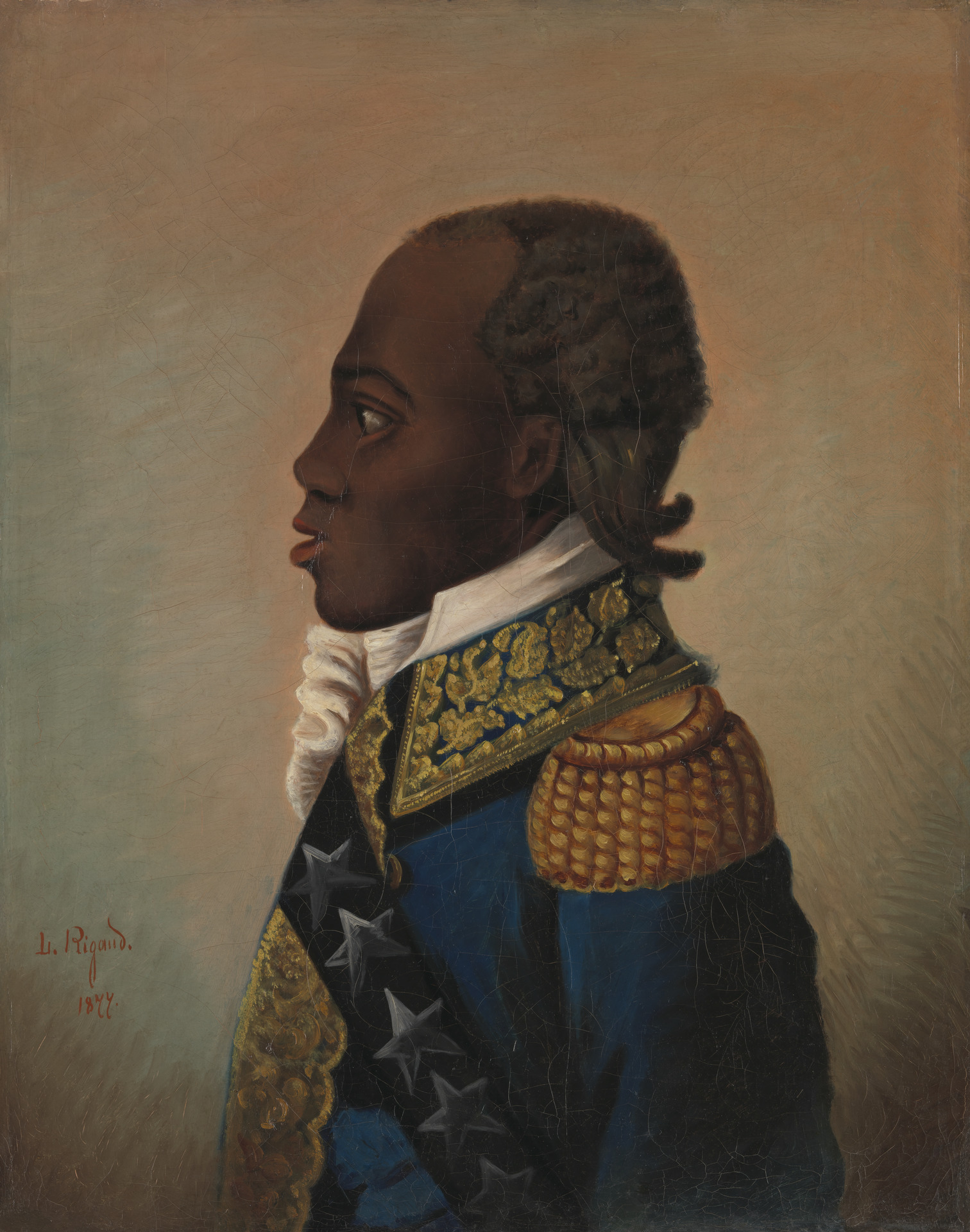
- Portrait of Toussaint Louverture painted by Lafargue Rigaud
- Born: June 28, 1847; Port-au-Prince
- Died: 3 June 1910 (aged 62)
- Other name: Louis Rigaud
- Known for: Painting

Faustin Lafargue Rigaud (June 28, 1847 - June 3, 1910) was a Haitian painter, most known for his portrait of Toussaint Louverture made in 1877. This political portrait was part of a set of 17, making it the most intact group of oil paintings from the nineteenth century to be produced by a Haitian artist in Haiti itself. The artist was formerly known as Louis Rigaud, largely due to reference of the work of French art historian Michel-Philippe Lerebours. After the 2010 earthquake that devastated Haiti, interest in safeguarding the cultural heritage of the country was renewed. Curators and Haitian art historians took greater interest in the set of portraits, which have been in the collection of Yale University’s Peabody Museum of Natural History since 1963. Historian of French and Black studies Maurene Daut discovered the artist’s real name to be Lafargue Rigaud, not Louis Rigaud, in 2026 through archival research.

== Portraits of Haitian Heads of State ==
Fifteen surviving portraits by Lafargue Rigaud of Haitian figures in the Peabody Collection before their restoration, 2012. Photograph by Mark Aronson. Peabody Museum, Yale University.

The suite of portraits of were made between 1878 and 1881, and include the following leaders of Haiti:

1. Toussaint Louverture, leader of the Haitian Revolution from 1791-1802
2. Jean-Jacques Dessalines (Jacques I), Emperor, 1804-1806
3. Henri Christophe (Henry I), Emperor, North Haiti (the State of Haiti), 1807-1820
4. Alexandre Pétion, President, Southern Haiti (Republic of Haiti), 1807-1818
5. Jean-Pierre Boyer, President, Southern Haiti (Republic of Haiti) 1818-1820
6. Charles Rivière-Hérard, President, Reunified Haiti, 1843-1844
7. Philippe Guerrier, President, Reunified Haiti, 1844-1845
8. Jean-Baptiste Riché, President, Reunified Haiti, 1846-1847
9. Faustin Soulouque (Faustin I), Emporer, 1847-1859
10. Fabre Geffrard, President, 1859-1867
11. Jean-Nicolas Nissage Saget, President, 1869-1874
12. Michel Domingue, President, 1874-1876
13. Pierre Théoma Boisrond-Canal, President, 1876-1879
14. Lysius Salomon, President, 1879-1888

The suite also includes a portrait of Michel Louis Polémon Lorquet, military general from 1865-1876, under Presidents Nissage Saget and Domingue. Two portraits are currently lost, Jean-Louis Pierrot, President from 1845-1846, and Sylvain Salnave, President from 1867-1869. Rigaud's painting of Toussaint Louverture is the earliest known portrait of the revolutionary made by a Haitian artist.

=== Provenance ===
The suite of portraits first came to the United States in 1884 for the World’s Industrial and Cotton Centennial Exposition in New Orleans, Louisiana. It was part of a section called “The Colored People’s Exhibition,” which had the theme of "Hayti." Upon the bankrupting of the exposition, the Smithsonian American Art Museum, known at the time as National Collection of Fine Arts, selected the portraits for its collection as a gift from Haiti. Eighty years later, the seventeen portraits were rediscovered in storage in an attic, and transferred to the Peabody Museum of Natural History at Yale University. Instead of entering storage in the museum, the portraits were hung in the home of Richard Morse, a professor whose wife, Emerante de Pradines, was a Haitian singer. The couple moved with the portraits to Stanford University before they were returned to Peabody storage. Two paintings were lost during this time and remain unaccounted for.

In 2026, for the first time in 140 years, the portraits are being displayed together, in an exhibition at the Peabody titled "Haiti in the Age of Revolutions: Lafargue Rigaud’s Portraits of Independence." Co-curator Marlene Daut told Yale News, “What a statement to have this sovereign Black nation, a free nation, showing all of its rulers in this stately fashion.” Discussing the portraits, Sarah Clunis, head of anthropology at the Peabody, also stated, "I do think the choice to put them in the anthropology collection in 1963 had to do with the fact that they represented people who were not of European descent. They represented images that people would consider to be exotic or othered or different.”

== Archival Research ==
Marlene Daut found the real name of Lafargue Rigaud, who signed his portraits "L. Rigaud" and was formerly misidentified as Louise Rigaud, in Haitian governmental records regarding compensation for the placement of his paintings in government buildings in Port-au-Prince. Daut was then able to find his birth and death records, the names of his parents, and his marriage certificate. Rigaud's signatures on his children's birth and marriage records were then matched to those on his paintings, confirming the identification. Daut cites the digitization efforts of Association de Généalogie d’Haïti in Montreal, and FamilySearch as being helpful to her research.
