= Sory Kandia Kouyaté =

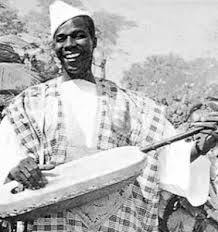
Sory Kandia Kouyaté

Sorya Kandia Kouyaté was a Guinean singer, considered at his early death in 1977 "one of the most powerful and mesmerizing African singers alive." Known for his powerful voice, and nicknamed "the voice of Africa", his music mixed tradition with jazz before the worldwide boom in African music. A celebrity in Guinea, he appeared at the UN and toured abroad. The 2012 reissue of a collection of his songs and a new book-length biography brought him to renewed attention.
