= Kolade Oshinowo =

Nigerian painter (born 1948)

- Born: February 6, 1948 (age 78)
- Citizenship: Nigerian
- Occupation: Artist

Kolade Oshinowo (born February 6, 1948) is a Nigerian artist, painter, portraitist.

== Early life and education ==
Oshinowo is indigene of Ikorodu in Lagos state. He was born in Ibadan, Oyo state in 1948. He graduated from the Ahmadu Bello University in 1972.

== Career ==
After his debut solo exhibition in 1973 at the Goethe Institut in Lagos, he went on to host six more solo exhibitions by the end of the 1970s and displayed his work internationally. In 1977, he participated in the Nigerian Exhibition at FESTAC 77. By 1984, Oshinowo was featured in a traveling solo exhibition organized by the Nigerian National Museum, which toured several cities including Lagos, Benin, and Jos.

He was head of the Fine Arts department, Yaba College of Technology in 1986. He was director of the School of Art, Design and Printing in 1990, and deputy rector of the Yaba College of Technology between 1992 and 1996. He became the national secretary of the Society of Nigeria Artists between 1972 and 1980 and a fellow of the society in 2004 before becoming the president between 2005 and 2008.

In honor of his 70th birthday, an art exhibition tagged Living Legend: a Tribute to Kolade Oshinowo was hosted by the School of Art Design and Printing in Yaba College of Technology.

== Works ==
Here are some of Oshinowo's works

- Enduring Passion (2022)
- The Protest (2021)
- Exploration (1986)
- Iya Ibeji (1997)
- Masquerades (1994)
- Waterfront (1990)
- Chibok Girls
- Internally Displaced Persons (IDPs)
- Cries from Sambisa Forest
- Nomads
- Immigrants and No Fuel, No Work

== Awards ==
He was conferred the National Productivity Order of Merit Award by the Federal Republic of Nigeria in 2004.
