= Présence Africaine =

Pan-African cultural, political and literary magazine

- Categories: literature, philosophy, African studies
- Frequency: Quarterly
- Publisher: Présence africaine
- Founder: Alioune Diop
- Founded: 1947; 79 years ago
- First issue: November 1947
- Country: France
- Based in: Paris
- Language: French (English abstracts)
- Website: http://www.presenceafricaine.com
- ISSN: 0032-7638

Présence Africaine (French for African Presence) is a pan-African quarterly cultural, political, and literary magazine, published in Paris, France, and founded by Alioune Diop in 1947. In 1949, Présence Africaine expanded to include a publishing house and a bookstore on rue des Écoles in the Latin Quarter of Paris. The journal was highly influential in the Pan-Africanist movement, the decolonisation struggle of former French colonies, and the birth of the Négritude movement.

== Magazine ==
The magazine published its first issue in November 1947, founded by Alioune Diop a Senegal-born professor of philosophy, along with a cast of African, European, and American intellectuals, writers, and social scientists, including Aimé Césaire, Léopold Sédar Senghor, Boubou Hama, Alioune Sarr, Richard Wright, Albert Camus, André Gide, Jean-Paul Sartre, Théodore Monod, Georges Balandier and Michel Leiris. While not all authors published in the magazine were from the African diaspora, its subtitle (Revue Culturelle du Monde Noir/Cultural Review of the Negro World) makes clear that the editors saw themselves engaged in the cultural and political struggles of panafricanism. With the move by Aimé Césaire and Léopold Sédar Senghor to PA (from Césaire's own journal L'Étudiant noir), the magazine became the pre-eminent voice of the Négritude movement.

In 1956, Alioune Diop and Présence Africaine organised the 1st International Congress of Black Writers and Artists (1er Congrès international des écrivains et artistes noirs) in Paris, which included Aimé Césaire, Léopold Sédar Senghor, Jacques Rabemananjara, Cheikh Anta Diop, Richard Wright, Frantz Fanon, and Jean Price-Mars, and for which Pablo Picasso designed a poster.

Although there have occasionally been English-language pieces and English-language abstracts in the magazine since its start, French has always been the main language. Between 1955 and January 1961, the magazine also published an English edition (also entitled Présence Africaine), which ran to 60 issues.

Through the leadership of Aimé Césaire, Présence Africaine was an anti-colonialist magazine as well. Its articles were a direct involvement with the anti-colonialist struggle and together, the writers and thinkers strove to denounce colonial racism through their foundational texts.

Although Césaire's most famous text Discours sur le Colonialisme is constantly being republished and translated (and scholars such as Robin D. G. Kelley have added their contributions, including "A Poetics of Anticolonialism"), Césaire's original text was published as Discours sur le Colonialisme by Présence Africaine in 1955. The essay had previously been published in 1950 by Editions Redame, and a revised version was published in Présance Africaine in 1955.

Works from Présence Africaine were also used in other anti-colonialist literature. For example, Frantz Fanon used excerpts from Présence Africaine in his anti-colonialist text Black Skin, White Masks, citing the work of Aimé Césaire, Michel Salomon, Abdoulaye Sadji, George Moulin, and countless other essential thinkers in order to strengthen his claims about denouncing colonial racism.

Présence Africaine operated a bookstore in the Latin Quarter of Paris. In 1962, this bookstore was the target of a terrorist attack by the far-right Organisation armée secrète, carried out with plastic explosives.

== Publishing house ==
Editions Présence Africaine was the first imprint to publish most of the best known Francophone African writers of the 20th century, including the literature of Mongo Beti, Ken Bugul, Birago Diop, Djibril Tamsir Niane, Williams Sassine, Ousmane Sembène, Léopold Sédar Senghor, as well as the philosophical works of Cheikh Anta Diop among others. Editions Présence Africaine was also the first to publish French translations of Anglophone writers such as Chinua Achebe, Wole Soyinka, Ngugi wa Thiong’o, and the pan-Africanist leaders Kwame Nkrumah and Julius Nyerere.

== Recent history ==
Alioune Diop remained publisher until his death in 1980, when his wife Christiane Yandé Diop took over. The 50th anniversary of Présence Africaine was celebrated at UNESCO in Paris in 1997, and attended by Daniel Maximin and Wole Soyinka, among others.

As of the end of 2007, Présence Africaine had run to 173 issues, with its Editions Présence Africaine publishing more than 400 works, 322 of which are still in print. Discourse on Colonialism by Aimé Césaire, first published in 1955, remains the company's best-selling work. In addition, new African works are published, by novelists including Hamidou Dia, Antoinette Tidjani Alou and Dieudonné Gnammankou and historians such as Aboucrary Moussa Lam.

Présence Africaine's current publications director is Romuald Fonkoua, professor of comparative French literature at Université Marc Bloch in Strasbourg.

== See also ==
- Decolonisation of Africa
- Négritude
