= Hamidou Dia =

Senegalese writer, literary critic, and philosophy teacher (1953–2018)

Hamidou Dia (1953 in Saldé – February 4, 2018) was a Senegalese writer, literary critic, and philosophy teacher.

He studied philosophy in Dakar and Paris, and achieved a doctorate in French Literature at the University of Laval. He later taught philosophy in the United States, Canada and Senegal.

== Works ==
- Les Sanglots de l'espoir, 1987
- Le Serment, 1987
- Koumbi Saleh ou Les pâturages du ciel, 1993
- Les Remparts de la mémoire, 1999
- Poètes d'Afrique et de Antilles, 2002
- Poésie africaine et engagement, 2002
- L'Écho des jours, 2008 (with a preface by Cheikh Hamidou Kane)
- Présences, 2011
- Aboubakry Kane, le dernier fils de la Grande Royale, 2013 (co-written with Youssouph Mbargane Guissé)
