= Pratt City Carline Historic District =

Historic district in Alabama, United States

- U.S. National Register of Historic Places
- Alabama Register of Landmarks and Heritage
- Location within Alabama
- Location: Ave. U from Ave. A to Carline and Carline from Ave. W to 6th St., Birmingham, Alabama
- Coordinates: 33°31′57″N 86°53′01″W
- Area: 80 acres (32 ha)
- Architectural style: Late 19th And Early 20th Century American Movements, Late 19th And 20th Century Revivals
- NRHP reference No.: 89000118

Significant dates
- Added to NRHP: March 2, 1989
- Designated ARLH: February 19, 1988

The Pratt City Carline Historic District is in Birmingham, Alabama and was listed on the National Register of Historic Places in 1989. Also known as the Carline District, it developed along a historic streetcar line. It is roughly along Avenue U from Avenue A to Carline and Carline from Avenue W to 6th St.

It includes 61 contributing buildings, including 37 Commercial brick structures.
