= Mwesa Isaiah Mapoma =

Zambian ethnomusicologist

Mwesa Isaiah Mapoma is one of Zambia's best-known ethnomusicologists and is considered by many as a pioneer in the field of African ethnomusicology. He was born in Kombaniya village in Mansa on November 2, 1936, and died on November 16, 2020. A graduate of Zambia's famed Munali Boy's Secondary School, and Trinity College in London, Dr. Mapoma received his Doctorate in Music from the University of California, Los Angeles (UCLA). His dissertation research focused on the royal musicians of the Bemba people in Zambia's Luapula Province. His field recordings are preserved in the UCLA ethnomusicology archive. Dr. Mapoma is remembered as tireless champion of African arts, culture, music and tradition.
