= Congress of Black Writers and Artists =

Meeting of leading black intellectuals

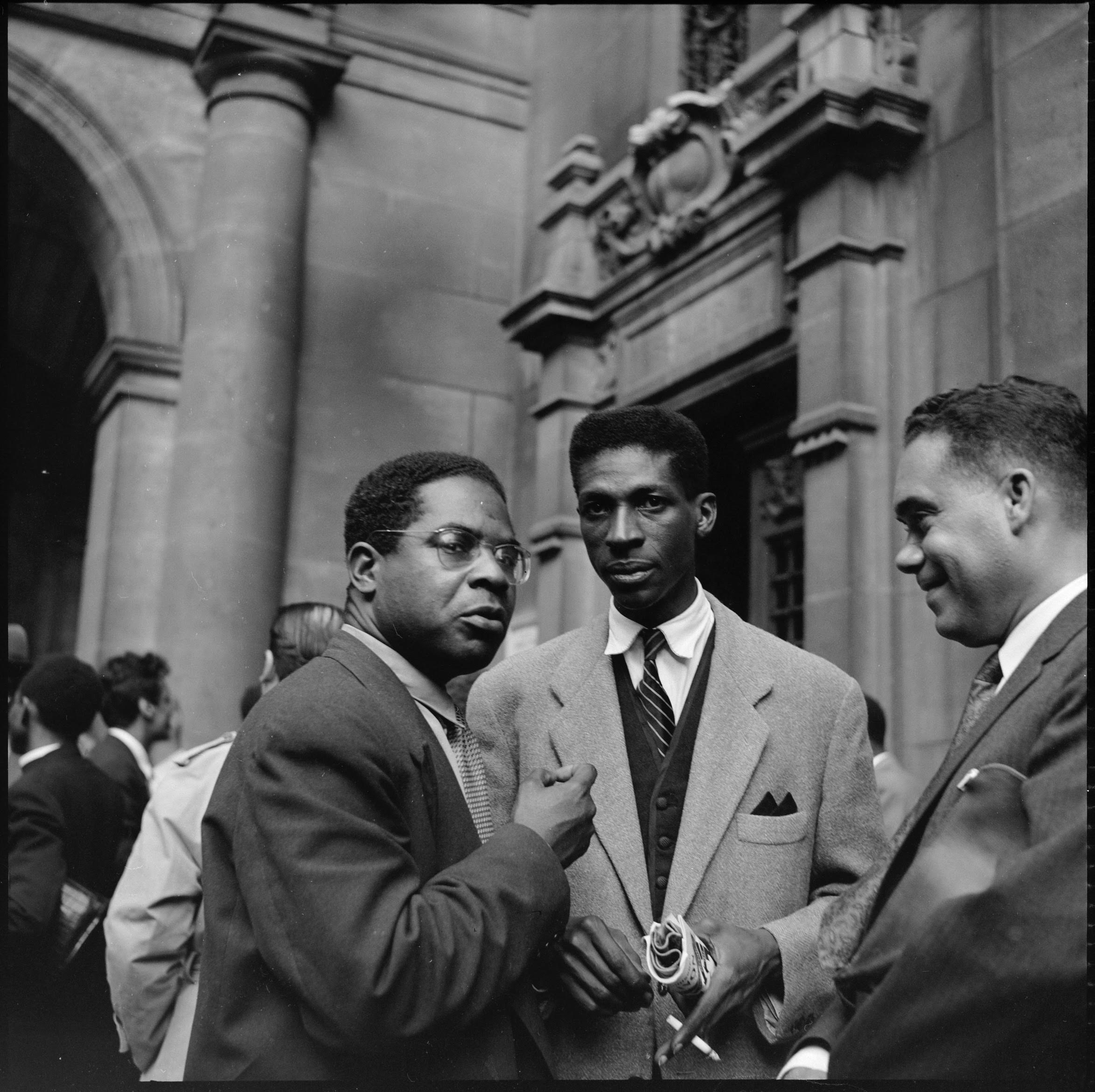
Aimé Césaire, Jacques Alexis and Richard Wright at La Sorbonne in September 1956.

The Congress of Black Writers and Artists (French: Congrès des écrivains et artistes noirs; originally called the Congress of Negro Writers and Artists) was a meeting of leading black intellectuals for the purpose of addressing the issues of colonialism, slavery, and Négritude. The First Congress of Black Writers and Artists was organized by the Pan-African quarterly cultural, political, and literary review Présence Africaine. It was held in Paris, France, in September 1956. Ahmed Sékou Touré spoke at the Second Congress of Black Writers and Artists, which was held in Rome, Italy, in 1959. One of the most influential Congress was held in Montreal, Canada, at McGill University, October 11–14, 1968; it was organized primarily by the Caribbean Conference Committee and was described as the "largest Black Power conference ever held outside the United States".

== "Princes and Powers" by James Baldwin ==
The account of the 1956 congress in the essay "Princes and Powers", by African-American writer James Baldwin (originally published in Encounter in January 1957 and included in 1961's Nobody Knows My Name: More Notes of A Native Son), has been credited with bringing the congress to the attention of the English-speaking world. Reports of the congress were published in many newspapers around Paris, giving the wider French audience an idea of the issues being discussed. The essay was published in the literary journal Preuves, which – unknown to Baldwin – was a front for the CIA. Regardless of the political ties, this essay spread the news of the Black Congress to English-speakers around the world.

== Congress of Black Writers and Artists in Montreal ==
In 1968, from October 11 to October 14, the Congress of Black Writers and Artists was held at McGill University in memory of figures such as Malcolm X and Martin Luther King. The congress was organized primarily by a young crowd consisting mostly of Caribbean and Black Canadian students while being sponsored by McGill's West Indian Student Association. The congress brought together various significant Black intellectuals such as Michael X, Rocky Jones, C. L. R. James, Walter Rodney, James Forman and most notably, Stokely Carmichael. The goal of this event was to discuss the attainment of Black independence through vocalizations opposing issues including Racism, Capitalism, Colonization, and the practice of discrimination.

Ideas were presented at the conference in four separate sections: "The Origin and Consequences of the Black-White Confrontation", The Germs of the Modern Black Awareness", "The Re-Evaluation of the Past" and "Perspectives for the Future". It was described by the McGill Daily as the "largest Black Power conference ever held outside the United States". The event was controversial for allowing White individuals to attend, but it was immediately followed by an assembly exclusive to Black individuals, who divided into caucuses representing several countries and developed a series of resolutions relevant to those nations.
