= FESPACO 2023 =

Annual film festival held in Ouagadougou, Burkina Faso

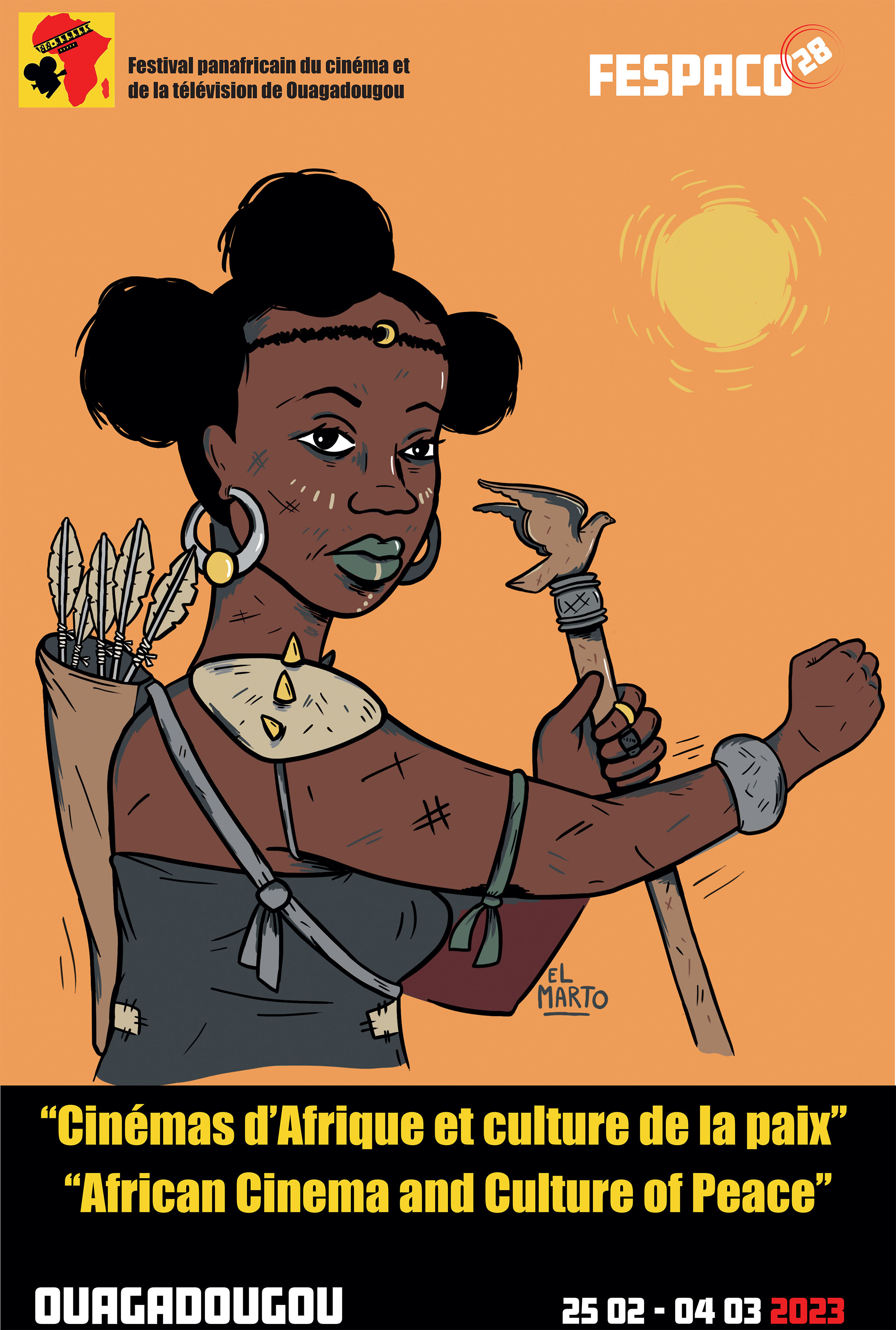
- Location: Ouagadougou, Burkina Faso
- Founded: 1969
- Festival date: 25 February - 5 March 2023
- Website: FESPACO
- FESPACO 2025

FESPACO 2023 is the 28th edition of the Pan-African Film and Television Festival of Ouagadougou. It took place from 25 February to 4 March 2023 in Ouagadougou. The theme of the edition was “African Cinema and Culture of Peace".

It was initially announced that the guest country of honour was Togo, but during the installation ceremony of the members of the National Organizing Committee, Fidèle Tamini, the secretary general of the Ministry of Culture, announced that “in view of challenges of the moment, there is no better partner than Mali to be the guest country of honour."

A total of 170 films were selected from about 1200 submissions to compete in 11 categories.

== Progress ==
=== Preparation ===
The general delegate Alex Moussa Sawadogo, unveiled the official selection during a press conference in Ouagadougou on 13 January 2023. He announced that the estimated budget for the 2023 edition was approximately 2 billion CFA francs.

The selection committee was made up of African cinema professionals including:

- Pedro Pimenta - Mozambican producer
- Lina Chabanne - Tunisian producer
- Guy Désiré Yaméogo - Burkinabé producer
- Laza Razanajatovo - Malagasy filmmaker
- Claire Diao - Burkinabé film critic and distributor
- Farah Clémentine Dramani-Issoufou - Beninois programmer and researcher
- Enoka Julien Ayemba - Cameroonian film researcher and critic
- Hawa Essuman - Kenyan director

The Yennenga Workshops aiming to support fims in the post-production phase and to promote the immersion of aspiring cinema professionals was launched. The Yennenga Post-production jury was chaired by South African director and producer Tiny Mungwe.

As part of the Yennenga workshops, FESPACO launched the first edition of the French-speaking Africa Coproduction Market called “Yennenga Coproduction”, dedicated to feature-length fiction film projects seeking partners, particularly financial ones, with fifteen directors or producers established in the French-speaking countries of West and Central Africa. 17 feature film fiction projects were selected. The 2023 edition of the Yennenga Academy was supported by Nigerien filmmaker, Aïcha Macky.

On 15 September, the United States Embassy donated computers, screens and printers to FESPACO worth more than 16 million CFA francs.

On 15 February, 2023, the Burkinabè National Lottery (LONAB) offered 50 million to FESPACO for the organization of the 28th edition.

=== Context ===
Preparations for the 28th FESPACO were marred by security concerns. The organizing committee however assured the attending public that security measures were put in place to ensure a "secure FESPACO". The announcement to maintain the 28th edition on the planned date was made on December 1, 2022, a decision taken by interim President Ibrahim Traoré “who notes significant progress in the preparations”.

=== The Official Poster ===
This poster designed by El Marto represents the legendary figure of Sarraounia to illustrate the theme “African Cinema and Culture of Peace”. Sarraounia means queen in Hausa. This name was given to an Amazon, political and religious leader of the village of Lougou in Niger, who opposed the Voulet-Chanoine mission. She is the subject of the 1986 film Sarraounia based on the novel of the same name by Nigerien writer Abdoulaye Mamani. The film won the Étalon de Yennenga in 1987.

According to the FESPACO communication, the poster is “a symbol of African pride, resistance, and resilience” which “emphasizes a fighter with her warrior attributes at a time when we must highlight the Forces of Defense and Security and the Volunteers for the Defense of the Fatherland, to salute their sacrifice, their courage and their patriotic commitment”.

=== Opening ceremony ===
The opening ceremony took place on Saturday February 25 at the Palais des Sports de Ouaga 2000 with the show I have a dream by choreographer Serge Aimé Coulibaly. The Burkinabe prime minister, Apollinaire Joachim Kyélem de Tambèla and the Malian prime minister, Choguel Kokalla Maïga jointly gave the traditional opening clap.

During the professional opening in the evening, the film Bravo, Burkina! by Nigerian director and designer Walé Oyéjidé was screened, whose goal was to remind viewers of the size and interconnectedness of the world.

=== Highlights ===
Two new statues were inaugurated on avenue Monseigneur Thévenoud from the filmmakers' square in front of the central town hall depicting the Malian filmmaker Cheick Oumar Sissoko and the Nigerien filmmaker Oumarou Ganda.

A bust of Ousmane Sembène was unveiled in front of the FESPACO headquarters on the occasion of the hundredth anniversary of his birth. His bust joins that of another Senegalese director, Paulin Soumanou Vieyra, which was installed in 2017.

A week before the festival, free open-air sessions were organized for those displaced by terrorism in the town of Kaya, as well as during FESPACO in the districts of Bassinko, Pissy, Dassasgho and on the Place de la Nation in the city center. After FESPACO, the traditional mini-FESPACO was held in Bobo-Dioulasso. This was followed by another edition from March 15 to 25 in Banfora with the theme of the role of internally displaced persons in the management of the security crisis.

=== Juries ===
The juries were composed of African cinema personalities thus:

- Tunisian producer Dora Bouchoucha chaired the Feature Film Jury, made up of Abdoulaye Konaté, Michèle Rakotoson, Licínio Azevedo, Khadar Ayderus Ahmed, Odile Sankara and Lemohang Jeremiah Mosese.
- South African producer Steven Markovitz chaired the Feature Documentary jury, made up of Dieudo Hamadi, Christophe Konkobo, Hicham Falah, N'Goné Fall, Jessica and Kidi Aïcha Macky.
- Nigerian director Kunle Afolayan chairs the Perspectives jury, made up of Rabih El-Khoury, Wendy Bashi, Karim Aïtouna and Issiaka Konaté.
- Former FESPACO general delegate Ardjouma Soma chaired the jury of the Burkina section, made up of Dr Dorothée Dognon, Pocas Pascoal, Fargass Assandé and Aboubacar Demba Cissokho.
- Cameroonian director Françoise Ellong-Gomez chaired the FESPACO shorts jury, made up of Boureima Salouka, Souleymane Kebe, Hirst Shebat and Glasgow-Maeda Neigeme.
- Ivorian-Guadeloupean producer Gnama Baddy Dega chaired the TV series/animation jury, made up of Toumani Sangaré, Daniel Atchali, Séraphine Angoula and Kandy Guira.
- Cape Verdean producer Pedro Soulé chaired the film school film jury, made up of Raymond M. Tiendrebeogo, Jacqueline Murekeyisoni, Sitou Ayité and Andrey Diarra.

=== Masterclass, Forum debates and round tables ===
Masterclasses were organized with:

- Souleymane Cissé and Gaston Kaboré for fiction
- Jean-Marie Teno and Michel K. Zongo for documentary
- Dora Bouchoucha and Steven Markovitz for production
- Samantha Biffot and Fatou Kandé Senghor for TV series
- Maurice H. Ouedraogo, Martine Somé and Pathé Ouedraogo for costume design

Every morning at the professional space, debate forums allowed the audience and festival participants to meet filmmakers and discuss their films.

Roundtable discussions covered the following themes:

- Scriptwriting, adaptation and novelization: How to pool resources and skills to support literature, cinema, and audiovisuals in Africa?
- The presence of the Diaspora at FESPACO: A historical and critical reflection.
- FESPACO in the Diaspora: Connections with international festivals and proposals for an integrated future.
- On the occasion of the centenary of Sembène Ousmane's birth, for a critical approach to his work (African Federation of Film Critics).
- Sankofa Challenge - The Movie.
- FEPACI on film restoration.
- South-South and global co-productions.
- Film markets in Africa and beyond - what opportunities for creators?

== Selection ==
=== Feature fiction films ===
Fifteen films from thirteen countries competed for the Yennenga Gold Standard. Eight were made by women.

Title	Director	Country	Duration
Abu Saddam	Nadine Khan	Egypt	89
Ashkal	Youssef Chebbi	Tunisia	92
Bantu Mama	Ivan Herrera	Dominican Republic	77
Mami Wata	CJ "Fiery" Obasi	Nigeria	107
Maputo Nakuzandza	Ariadine Zampaulo	Mozambique	60
My father, the devil	Ellie Foumbi	Cameroon	108
Our Lady of The Chinese Shop	Ery Claver	Angola	98
Shimoni	Angela Wamai	Kenya	97
Simin Zetwal (Looking at the stars)	David Constantine	Mauritius	92
Sira	Apolline Traore	Burkina Faso	120
The Blue Caftan	Maryam Touzani	Morocco	123
The Last Queen	Damien Ounouri	Algeria	113
The Planter's Plantation	Dingha Eystein Young	Cameroon	114
Under the Fig Trees	Erige Sehiri	Tunisia	92
Xalé, the Wounds of Childhood	Moussa Sene Absa	Senegal	101

=== Feature-length documentaries ===
Title	Director	Country	Duration
Original Paradise ( Al Djanat )	Chloé Aïcha Boro	Burkina Faso	85
Pick Me (Amchilini )	Kader Allamine	Chad	68
In the Film Cemetery	Thierno Souleymane Diallo	Guinea	93
Doxandem, the dream chasers	Saliou Sarr	Senegal	88
Fatima - a short life	Hakim El Hachoumi	Morocco	80
Guardian of the worlds	Leila Chaïbi	Algeria	91
Geology of Separation	Yosr Gasmi and Mauro Mazzocchi	Tunisia	152
I Remain a Photographer	Ananias Leki Dago	Ivory Coast	67
Money, freedom, a history of the CFA franc	Katy Léna N'Diaye	Senegal	100
MK, Mandela's secret army	Osvalde Lewat	Cameroon	61
Lagos Tangier, One Way ( No U-Turn )	Ike Nnaebue	Nigeria	94
We, Students!	Rafiki Fariala	Central African Republic	82
Omi Nobu ( The New Man )	Carlos Yuri Ceuninck	Cape Verde	67
Gold of Life	Boubacar Sangaré	Burkina Faso	90

=== Short film fiction (FESPACO shorts 1) ===
Title	Director	Country	Duration
A doll's house in memory of men and their dreams of ashes buried under the gaze of midnight while the gentle bars of the animal maze open the true master of the cage and the lies of the fold	Andriaminosoa Hary Joël Rakotovelo	Madagascar	20
Agwe	Samuel Suffren	Haiti	17
Astel	Ramata-Toulaye Sy	Senegal	24
Double I	Lauren Providencia Sanou	Burkina Faso	16
On the way	Leslie To	Burkina Faso	09
Mundele game / Game of chance	Khadafi Mbuyamba	Democratic Republic of Congo	30
Spring days	Imad Badi	Morocco	18
Khadiga	Morad Mostafa	Egypt	20
The Messenger of God	Amina Abdoulaye Mamani	Niger	23
Sunday Morning ( Manhã de Domingo )	Bruno Ribeiro	Brazil	25
Mulika	Maisha Maene	Democratic Republic of Congo	14
Patriots	Laurentine Bayala	Burkina Faso	15
Weave of Tenderness	Ouijdane Khallid	Morocco	24
Mother Earth (Terra Mater)	Kantarama Gahigiri	Rwanda	10
Tsutsu	Amartei Armar	Ghana	15
Twin Lakes Haven	Philbert Aimé Mbabazi Sharangabo	Rwanda	24
Uje	Jean-Luc Mitana	Rwanda	19
Will My Parents Come to See Me? ( Are my parents going to come see me? )	Mo Harawe	Somalia	28
Yes!	John Oluwole Adekoje	Nigeria	22
Ziwa ( The Lake )	Samuel Tebandeke	Uganda	15

=== Short film documentaries (FESPACO shorts 2) ===
Title	Director	Country	Duration
Blind Spot	Lotfi Achour	Tunisia	13
Burkina Babes	Kagho Idhebor	Nigeria	7
Cuba in Africa	Negash Abdurahman	Ethiopia	22
Katanga Nation	Beza Hailu Lemma	Ethiopia	27
Kelasi	Fransix Tenda Lomba	Democratic Republic of Congo	10
Villa Reynette: cement and love	Evelyne Agli	Benin	16
The Riders of Tonka	Mohamed Dayfour Diawara	Mali	11
Louvri pou mwen (Open for me )	Jess Di Pierro Obert	Haiti	17
Madame Pipi	Rachelle Salnave	Haiti	25
Just a smile mother (Mama dan que soriso )	Cyrielle Raingou	Cameroon	18
Xaar Yàlla (Waiting for God )	Mamadou Khouma Gueye	Senegal	25

=== Perspective (feature-length fiction and documentaries) ===
Title	Director	Country	Duration
The Desert Rocker	Sarah Nacer	Algeria	75
The Specter of Boko Haram	Cyrielle Raingou	Cameroon	75
The Scarified	Wabinle Nadie	Burkina Faso	65
African Moot	Shameela Seedat	South Africa	85
Annatto	Fatima Boubakdy	Morocco	103
Can They See Us	Kenny Mumba	Zambia	90
The Sheep of Saada	Pope Bounam Lopy	Senegal	75
Otiti	Ema Edosio	Nigeria	93
Sadrack	Narcissus Wandji	Cameroon	94
Tooth for tooth	Ottis Ba	Senegal	87
Soula	Salah Issaad	Algeria	92

=== Panorama: feature films ===
Title	Director	Country	Duration
Alone in a Strange World (fiction)	Joel Sansi	Democratic Republic of Congo	103
Bangarang (fiction)	Robin Odongo	Kenya	88
Thorns of the Sahel (fiction)	Boubakar Diallo	Burkina Faso	92
Gravity (fiction)	Cedric Ido	Burkina Faso	85
The Ideal Job (fiction)	Gilbert Djoliba Bararmna-Boukpessi	Togo	96
The Pantheon of Joy (fiction)	Jean Odoutan	Benin	97
The Umbrella Men ( fiction)	John Barker	South Africa	115
Bobi Wine: The People's President (documentary)	Moses Bwayo	Uganda	121
The Taxi, The Cinema and Me (documentary)	Salam Zampaligré	Burkina Faso	69
Maayo Wonaa Keerol (The River is Not a Border ) (documentary)	Alassane Diago	Senegal	105
Min al Qahira (From Cairo) (documentary)	Hala Galal	Egypt	63
Rewind and Play (documentary)	Alain Gomis	Senegal	65
Xaraasi Xanne ( The Crossed Voices ) (documentary)	Boubou Toure	Mali	120
Nayola (fiction, animation)	José Miguel Ribeiro	Angola	83

=== Burkina section (feature fiction and documentary films) ===
Title	Director	Country	Duration
Laabli the Elusive (documentary)	Luc Youlouka Damiba	Burkina Faso	72
The Gallop (documentary)	Eléonore Yaméogo	Burkina Faso	80
The Sam Mory Affair (fiction)	Boubakar Diallo	Burkina Faso	90
The Sermon of the Prophets (fiction)	Seydou Boundaone	Burkina Faso	98
Madi and Saga (fiction)	Yacouba Napon	Burkina Faso	111
Malla, as far as the night lasts (fiction)	Dramane Ouedraogo	Burkina Faso	96

=== Burkina section (short fiction and documentary films) ===
Title	Director	Country	Duration
Pains of women's lives	Habibou Zoungrana	Burkina Faso	24
Elisa (doc)	Faisal Léonce Soura	Burkina Faso	13
The Botanist	Floriane Zoundi	Burkina Faso	13
Innocence	Thomas Hénoc Ouedraogo	Burkina Faso	15
Papa Eric the tender	Wendkoagnda Gaston Bonkoungou	Burkina Faso	11
Stay Up	Aïssata Ouarma	Burkina Faso	35

=== Television series ===
Title	Director	Country	Duration
Further and further	Hervé Eric Lengani	Burkina Faso	52x2
Fanga / The Power	Fousseyni Maïga	Mali	26x3
Here is C Babi	Boris Oue	Ivory Coast	13x6
Isabelle	Kismath Baguiri	Benin	26x3
Chic, shock, failure	Jérémie Tchoua	Gabon	26x3
The Imam, the chicken and the pastor	Dramane Gnessi	Burkina Faso	26x3
O Batanga	Alex Ogou	Ivory Coast	52x2
Nouka union	Gilbert Assi	Ivory Coast	26x3
A man to marry	Jean-Jules Porquet	Ivory Coast	26x3
Revenge	Simon William Kum	Cameroon	26x3
Yaay 2.0	Serigne Ababacar Ba	Senegal	26x3

=== Animated films ===
Title	Director	Country	Duration
Apache	Dubien Fortuné Tsete	Republic of Congo	07
Begho	Victoria Aryee and Daniel Kumah	Ghana	08
Fadi the Village of Transform	Cheick Ouattara	Mali	08
Impa the Unmeshed	Bomale Christian Hermann Kouamé	Ivory Coast	16
Kendila	Nadia Rais	Tunisia	12
Kwaba	Pierre-Marie Sindo	Ivory Coast	02
The Shadow of the Butterflies	Sofia El Khyari	Morocco	09
The Affront	Negueba Traore	Mali	03
The Palimpsests	Ingrid Agbo	Togo	07
My grandpa	Komi Messan Anthony	Togo	07
On the Surface	Fan Sissoko	Mali	04
Paya and Koulou	Dramane Minta	Mali	15
Princess Yennenga	Abdoul Rayhim Saïd Junior Koné	Burkina Faso	13
Queen of Guera	Khalil Salma	Chad	29
Storm in a Calabash	Serge Dimitri Pitroipa	Burkina Faso	15
The Pyramid	Mohamed Ghazala	Egypt	07

=== Films from African cinema schools ===
Title	Director	School	Country
March 7	Alioune Fall	ESAV	Morocco
Whose fault is it	Ramatoulaye Bah	ISAMK	Guinea
Annaelle	Pierre Nicolas Mbumba	INPTIC	Gabon
Over time	Fassar Maurice Sarr	ESAV	Morocco
Confusion	Ornel Franckeski Mengue Dzo	INPTIC	Gabon
Tomorrow	Joseph Avimadje	ISMA	Benin
Eliza	Yowane Mezembe	INPTIC	Gabon
The East Station	Esso-Domna Roger Atana	ESEC	Togo
The gong rang	Altidor Gildas	ENSTIC UAC	Benin
the Boson Worshipers	Othniel Bonzi	ISTC Polytechnique	Ivory Coast
Open eyes	Armel Pengdwende Ariel Pouya	ISIS-SE	Burkina Faso
The impression	Ulrich Houndji	ENSTIC	Benin
Mataha	Ahmed Nader	Academy of Arts - High Cinema Institute	Egypt
Me and me	Adam Bana	ISMA, Benin	Benin
More than a duty	Mohamed Allabi	ISMA, Benin	Benin
For better and not worse	Judicaël Nzamba	INPTIC	Gabon
Back to basics	Danielle Esther Biyo'o Anding	IFCPA	Cameroon
Rogm Sebre / Birth certificate	Arlette Jessica Valia	ISIS-SE, Burkina Faso	Burkina Faso
Rescue	David Effaly	IUA	Ivory Coast
Souk	Wendkoagnda Gaston Bonkoungou	ISIS-SE, Burkina Faso	Burkina Faso
In the footsteps of my ancestors	Zeinab Soumahoro	ISTC Polytechnique	Ivory Coast
Traffic / Shakchouka	Iheb Abidi	ISAMM	Tunisia

== Prize list ==
=== Official selection ===
The prices on the official list represent a total of 108 million CFA francs.

==== Feature fiction films ====
Prize	Winner	Country
Gold standard (20 M CFA francs)	Ashkal by Youssef Chebbi	Tunisia
Silver standard (10 M CFA francs) endowed and sponsored by the Delegation of the European Union	Sira by Apolline Traoré	Burkina Faso
Bronze standard (5 M CFA francs)	Shimoni by Angela Wamai	Kenya
Special mention from the jury	Looking at the Stars by David Constantin	Mauritius
Best screenplay (3 M CFA francs) endowed and sponsored by TV5 Monde	The Blue Caftan by Maryam Touzani	Morocco
Best image (1 M CFA francs)	Mami Wata by CJ "Fiery" Obasi	Nigeria
Best sound (1 M CFA francs)	Ashkal by Youssef Chebbi	Tunisia
Best music (1 M CFA francs)	Our Lady of the Chinese Shop by Ery Claver	Angola
Best decor (1 M CFA francs)	Mami Wata by CJ "Fiery" Obasi	Nigeria
Best editing (1 M CFA francs)	Abu Saddam by Nadine Khan	Egypt
Best female performance and best male performance (1 M FCFA x 2)	All the actors in Under the Fig Trees by Erige Sehiri	Tunisia

==== Feature-length documentaries ====
Price	Winner	Country
Gold standard (10 M CFA francs) endowed and sponsored by the United Nations System in Burkina Faso	Omi Nobu / The new man by Carlos Yuri Ceuninck	Cape Verde
Silver standard (5 M CFA francs) sponsored by LONAB	We, Students! by Rafiki Fariala	Central African Republic
Bronze standard (3 M FCFA)	Guardian of the Worlds by Leïla Chaibi	Algeria
Special mention	Money, Freedom, a History of the CFA franc by Katy Léna N'Diaye	Senegal
Special mention	At the Cemetery by Thierno Souleymane Diallo	Guinea

==== Fiction short films (Fespaco shorts 1) ====
Endowed and sponsored by the International Organization of La Francophonie.

Price	Winner	Country
Golden foal (5 M CFA francs)	Will My Parents Come to See Me by Mo Harawe	Somalia
Silver foal (3 M CFA francs)	A Doll House in the Memory of the Men and Their Dreams of Ash Buried Under the Sight of Midnight for the Sweet Rods of the Sweet Rods of the Warren Farm Cover the True Lord of the Cage and the Lullabies by Andriaminosoa Hary and Joël Rakotovelo	Madagascar
Bronze foal (2 M FCFA)	Tsutsue by Armatei Armar	Ghana
Special mention	The Messenger of God by Amina Abdoulaye Mamani	Niger
Special mention	Mother Earth by Kantarama Gahigiri	Rwanda

==== Documentary short films (Fespaco shorts 2) ====
Prize	Winner	Country
Golden foal (5 M CFA francs)	Blind spot by Lotfi Achour	Tunisia
Silver foal (3 M CFA francs)	Katanga Nation by Beza Hailu Lemma	Ethiopia
Bronze foal (2 M FCFA)	Kelasi by Fransix Tenda Lomba	Democratic Republic of Congo

==== Perspectives Section ====
Prize	Winner	Country
Oumarou Ganda Prize for best first work or second work of feature-length fiction film (2 M CFA francs)	Soula by Salah Isaad	Algeria
Paul Robeson Prize for best first work or second work of feature-length documentary film (2 M CFA francs)	Le spectre de Boko Haram by Cyrielle Raingou	Cameroon
Special mention	The Sheep of Saada by Pape Bounam Lopy	Senegal

==== Burkina section ====
Prize	Winner	Country
Grand Prize from the President of Burkina Faso for the best Burkinabè film (5 M CFA)	Laabli the elusive by Luc Youlouka Damiba	Burkina Faso
Grand Prize from the President of Burkina Faso for the best Burkinabe hopeful (3 M CFA francs)	The Botanist by Floriane Zoundi	Burkina Faso
Grand prize of the President of Burkina Faso Revelation of cinema (2 M CFA francs) endowed by the Burkinabè Copyright Office (BBDA)	Malla, as far as the night lasts by Dramane Ouédraogo	Burkina Faso

==== TV series, animation, African film from film schools ====
Price	Assigned to	Country
1st Prize for Best TV Series (2 M CFA francs)	O Batanga by Alex Ogou	Ivory Coast
2nd Prize for Best TV Series (1 M CFA francs)	Further and further away from Hervé Eric Lengani and Fabien Dao	Burkina Faso
Special Mention TV Series	Here is C Babi by Boris Oué	Ivory Coast
Special Mention TV Series	Fanga / The Power of Fousseyni Maiga	Mali
1st Prize for animated short film (3M Fcfa)	Kendila by Nadia Rais	Tunisia
1st Prize animated film television series (2 M CFA francs)	Paya and Koulou by Dramane Minta	Mali
Special mention animated films	The Palimpsests by Ingrid Agbo	Togo
Special mention animated films	Queen of Guera by Khalil Salma	Chad
1st Prize for best African film from film schools (2 M CFA francs)	Whose fault is Ramatoulaye Bah, ISAMK?	Guinea
2nd Prize for best African film from film schools (1 M CFA francs)	In the footsteps of my ancestors by Zeinab Soumahoro, ISTC Polytechnique	Ivory Coast
Special mention African film from film schools	Rogm Sebre / Birth certificate of Arlette Jessica Valia, ISIS-SE, Burkina Faso	Burkina Faso
Special mention African film from film schools	More than a duty by Mohamed Allabi, ISMA, Benin	Benin

=== Special prize list ===
The special prizes were awarded on Friday March 3, 2023, the day before closing. 106 million CFA francs were awarded in prizes.

Prize	Winner	Country
Thomas Sankara Short Film Prize (Guild of Directors and Producers, 3 M CFA)	Cuba in Africa by Negash Abdurahman	Ethiopia
ECOWAS special prize for integration for the Best West African film, 15 M CFA francs)	No U-Turn - A Journey from Lagos to Tangier by Ike Nnaebue	Nigeria
ECOWAS Prize for the Best West African Director (10 M CFA francs)	Sira by Apolline Traoré	Burkina Faso
ECOWAS Prize for the Best Film School Director (2 M CFA francs)	More Than a Duty by Mohamed Allabi	Benin
ECOWAS Prize for the Best Child actor or actress (1 M CFA francs)	Nguissaly Barry in Xalé, by Moussa Sene Absa	Senegal
Special Prize Burkina International Plan for Equality for Girls for combativeness and innovation in favor of girls (5 M CFA francs)	The Planter's Plantation by Dingha Eystein Young	Cameroon
Special Prize Transitional Legislative Assembly of Burkina Faso (7 M CFA)	Sira by Apolline Traoré	Burkina Faso
Paulin Soumanou Vieyra African Critics Prize ( FACC )	Mami Wata by CJ "Fiery" Obasi	Nigeria
UEMOA special prize for feature film fiction (8 M CFA francs)	Xalé, the childhood wounds of Moussa Sene Absa	Senegal
UEMOA special prize for short fiction film (5 M CFA francs)	The Messenger of God by Amina A. Mamani	Niger
UEMOA special prize for feature documentary (8 M CFA francs)	The Riders of Tonka by Mohamed Dayfour Diawara	Mali
UEMOA special prize for short documentary film (5 M CFA francs)	Al Djanat (Original Paradise) by Chloé Aïcha Boro	Burkina Faso
Ecobank Sembène Ousmane special prize (5 M CFA)	The Planter's Plantation by Dingha Eystein Young	Cameroon
Special prize from the Gambere Ernest Fund (2 M CFA francs)	The Messenger of God by Amina A. Mamani	Niger
LONAB Lucky Prize (5 M CFA)	The Messenger of God by Amina A. Mamani	Niger
Félix Houphouet-Boigny Prize from the Conseil de l’Entente (10 M CFA francs)	Sira by Apolline Traoré	Burkina Faso
Ababacar Samb Makharam price of the city of Ouagadougou (3 M CFA)	Al Djanat (Original Paradise) by Chloé Aïcha Boro	Burkina Faso
Wateraid Special Prize for Climate, Water and Sanitation in Africa (5 M CFA)	Sira by Apolline Traoré	Burkina Faso
Prize of the Burkina-Niger Episcopal Conference (2 M CFA francs)	The Messenger of God by Amina A. Mamani	Niger
Special price from the Laafi la Boumbou association (5 M CFA)	Sira, on the road by Fousseini Maïga	Mali
