= 2022 BFI London Film Festival =

2022 film festival

66th BFI London Film Festival
- Official artwork for the 2022 BFI London Film Festival
- Opening film: Matilda the Musical
- Closing film: Glass Onion: A Knives Out Mystery
- Location: London, United Kingdom
- Founded: 1957
- Awards: Best Film Award: Corsage
- Festival date: 5–16 October 2022
- Website: whatson.bfi.org.uk/lff/

BFI London Film Festival
- 2023 2021

The 66th BFI London Film Festival was a film festival that took place from 5–16 October 2022. British-American producer Tanya Seghatchian served as jury president. Marie Kreutzer's Corsage won the Best Film Award.

The festival opened with Matilda the Musical directed by Matthew Warchus and closed with Glass Onion: A Knives Out Mystery directed by Rian Johnson.

== Juries ==
=== Main Competition ===
- Tanya Seghatchian, British-American producer
- Gwendoline Christie, British actress
- Kemp Powers , American filmmaker and playwright
- Chaitanya Tamhane, Indian filmmaker
- Charles Gant, British journalist

=== First Feature Competition ===
- Nana Mensah, American actress, writer, and director
- Asim Chaudhry, British comedian and actor
- Isabel Stevens, British managing editor of Sight and Sound
- Kristy Matheson, Australian film programmer and creative director of the Edinburgh International Film Festival

=== Documentary Competition ===
- Roberto Minervini, Italian writer-director
- Tabitha Jackson, producer and former director of the Sundance Film Festival
- Morgan M. Page, Canadian writer and artist

=== Immersive Art and XR Competition ===
- Misan Harriman, Nigerian-British photographer
- Tonya Nelson, American regional director of Arts Council England
- Olivier Delpoux, French head of digital and audiovisual creation at Institut Français

=== Short Film Competition ===
- Joy Gharoro-Akpojotor, British producer
- Sorcha Bacon, British producer
- Caspar Salmon, British journalist
- Maddy Probst, British managing producer at Bristol Watershed

== Venues ==
Film screenings took place in 7 cinemas in London, while the Expanded section - dedicated to immersive art and extended realities (XR) - took place at 3 venues. Screenings for members of the press and film industry took place at two separate cinemas. Selected films were also screened at 10 additional cinemas across the UK.

=== London cinemas ===
- BFI Southbank
- Royal Festival Hall, Southbank Centre
- Curzon Soho
- Curzon Mayfair
- Institute of Contemporary Arts
- Odeon Luxe West End
- Prince Charles Cinema
- Odeon Luxe Leicester Square - Press and industry screenings
- Picturehouse Central - Press and industry screenings

=== Expanded venues ===
- 26 Leake Street
- National Theatre
- BFI Southbank

=== UK-wide cinemas ===
- Broadway Cinema, Nottingham
- Chapter, Cardiff
- Edinburgh Filmhouse, Edinburgh
- Glasgow Film Theatre, Glasgow
- HOME, Manchester
- MAC, Birmingham
- Queen's Film Theatre, Belfast
- Showroom Cinema, Sheffield
- Tyneside Cinema, Newcastle upon Tyne
- Watershed, Bristol

== Official Selection ==
=== Galas ===
The following films were selected for the Galas section, which screens world, European, and British premieres of the most anticipated films.

English Title	Original Title	Director(s)	Production Country	Gala
Matilda the Musical		Matthew Warchus	United Kingdom	Opening Night
Glass Onion: A Knives Out Mystery		Rian Johnson	United States	Closing Night
Empire of Light		Sam Mendes	United Kingdom, United States	American Express
The Banshees of Inisherin		Martin McDonagh	Ireland, United Kingdom, United States	American Express
Bardo, False Chronicle of a Handful of Truths	Bardo, falsa crónica de unas cuantas verdades	Alejandro González Iñárritu	Mexico	Headline
Decision to Leave	헤어질 결심	Park Chan-wook	South Korea	Headline
Living		Oliver Hermanus	United Kingdom	Headline
Guillermo del Toro's Pinocchio		Guillermo del Toro, Mark Gustafson	United States	Headline
She Said		Maria Schrader	United States	Headline
The Son		Florian Zeller	United Kingdom	Headline
Till		Chinonye Chukwu	United States	Mayor of London
The Whale		Darren Aronofsky	United States	BFI Patrons
White Noise		Noah Baumbach	United States	Headline
The Wonder		Sebastián Lelio	United Kingdom, Ireland	Headline

=== Special Presentations ===
The following films were selected for the Special Presentations section.

English Title	Original Title	Director(s)	Production Country
Allelujah		Richard Eyre	United Kingdom
Bones and All		Luca Guadagnino	United States
Causeway		Lila Neugebauer	United States
The English (episodes 1 and 2)		Hugo Blick	United Kingdom, Spain
The Eternal Daughter		Joanna Hogg	United Kingdom, United States
Holy Spider	عنکبوت مقدس	Ali Abbasi	Denmark, Germany, Sweden, France
My Imaginary Country	Mi país imaginario	Patricio Guzmán	Chile, France
Nanny		Nikyatu Jusu	United States
Nil by Mouth		Gary Oldman	United Kingdom
The Swimmers		Sally El Hosaini	United Kingdom
Triangle of Sadness		Ruben Östlund	Sweden, Germany, France, United Kingdom
Women Talking		Sarah Polley	United States
The Inspection		Elegance Bratton	United States
Piaffe		Ann Oren	Germany
“U Scantu”: A Disorderly Tale		Elisa Giardina Papa	Italy

=== In Competition ===
There were five competition sections, each with a different selection of films and different juries.

==== Official Competition ====
The following films competed for the Best Film Award.

English Title	Original Title	Director(s)	Production Country
Argentina, 1985		Santiago Mitre	Argentina
Brother		Clement Virgo	Canada
The Damned Don’t Cry	Les damnés ne pleurent pas	Fyzal Boulifa	France, Belgium, Morocco
Enys Men		Mark Jenkin	United Kingdom
Godland	Vanskabte Land	Hlynur Pálmas	Denmark, Iceland, France, Sweden
Saint Omer		Alice Diop	France

==== First Feature Competition ====
The following films competed for the Sutherland Award, which is awarded to a directorial debut.

English Title	Original Title	Director(s)	Production Country
1976		Manuela Martelli	Chile, Argentina, Qatar
Blue Jean		Georgia Oakley	United Kingdom
Jeong-sun		Jihye Jeong	South Korea
Joyland	جوائے لینڈ	Saim Sadiq	Pakistan
Medusa Deluxe		Thomas Hardiman	United Kingdom
Our Lady of the Chinese Shop	Nossa senhora da loja do chinês	Ery Claver	Angola
Robe of Gems	Manto de Gemas	Natalia López Gallardo	Argentina, Mexico
Rodeo		Lola Quivoron	France

==== Documentary Competition ====
The following films competed for the Grierson Award, which is awarded to a feature-length documentary.

English Title	Original Title	Director(s)	Production Country
All That Breathes		Shaunak Sen	India, United Kingdom, United States
All the Beauty and the Bloodshed		Nan Goldin	United States
Casa Susanna		Sébastien Lifshitz	France, United States
The Future Tense		Christine Molloy, Joe Lawlor	Ireland, United Kingdom
Kanaval: A People’s History of Haiti in Six Chapters		Leah Gordon, Eddie Hutton Mills	Haiti, United Kingdom
Lynch/Oz		Alexandre O. Philippe	United States
Name Me Lawand		Edward Lovelace	United Kingdom
What About China?		Trinh Minh-ha	United States, China, Singapore

==== Short Film Competition ====
The following films competed for the Short Film Award.

English Title	Original Title	Director(s)	Production Country
An Avocado Pit	Um Caroço de Abacate	Ary Zara	Portugal
Drop Out		Ade Femzo	United Kingdom
I Have No Legs, and I Must Run	跑！跑！跑！	Yue Li	China
The Ocean Analog	El oceano analogo	Luis Macias	Spain, Mexico
It’s Raining Frogs Outside	Ampangabagat nin talakba ha likol	Maria Estela Paiso	Spain, Mexico
The Ritual to Beauty		Maria Marrone, Shenny de Los Angeles	United States
Rosemary A.D. (After Dad)		Ethan Barrett	United States
A Sod State		Eoghan Ryan	Ireland, Netherlands
Transparent		Siobhan Davies	United Kingdom

==== Immersive Art and XR Competition ====
The following works competed for the Best Immersive Art and XR Award.

English Title	Original Title	Lead Artist(s)	Production Country
All Unsaved Progress Will be Lost		Mélanie Courtinat	France
Apparatus Ludens		Untold Garden	United Kingdom, Sweden
As Mine Exactly		Charlie Shackleton	United Kingdom
Black Movement Library – Movement Portraits		LaJuné McMillian	United States
The Choice		Joanne Popinska	Canada, Poland
Digital Motions		Helge Letonja, Marcel Karnapke, Björn Lengers, Anke Euler	Germany
FRAMERATE: Pulse of The Earth		Matthew Shaw, William Trossell, ScanLAB Projects	United Kingdom
In Pursuit of Repetitive Beats		Darren Emerson	United Kingdom
The Infinite Library		Mika Johnson	India, Germany, Czech Republic
Intravene		Darkfield, Crackdown, Brenda Longfellow	United Kingdom, Canada
The Last Time I Saw Snow		Isobel Mascarenhas-Whitman, Alex Tennyson	United Kingdom
Line of Contact		Dani Ploeger	Netherlands, United Kingdom, Ukraine
Missing Pictures: The Money Wrench Gang		Clément Deneux	France, United Kingdom, Taiwan, Luxembourg, South Korea
Monoliths		Lucy Hammond, Hannah Davies, Asma Elbadawi, Carmen Marcus	United Kingdom
On the Morning You Wake (To the End Of The World)		Jamaica Heolimeleikalani Osorio, Mike Brett, Steve Jamison, Arnaud Colinart, Pierre Zandrowicz	United Kingdom, France, United States
Pan + Tilt		Ruth Gibson, Bruno Martelli	United Kingdom
Planet City		Liam Young, Kayvan Boudai, Elliot Ordower, James Clark	United States, China
Walzer		Frieda Gustavs, Leo Erken	Netherlands

=== Strands ===
Most of the out-of-competition films have been organised into strands, each based on a different mood or emotion.

==== Love ====
English Title	Original Title	Director(s)	Production Country
Aftersun		Charlotte Wells	United Kingdom, United States
Blue Bag Life		Lisa Selby, Rebecca Hirsch Lloyd-Evans, Alex Fry	United Kingdom
The Blue Caftan	Le Bleu du caftan	Maryam Touzani	France, Morocco, Belgium
Bros		Nicholas Stoller	United States
Close		Lukas Dhont	Belgium, France, Netherlands
The Cloud Messenger	Meghdoot	Rahat Mahajan	India
Lady Chatterley's Lover		Laure de Clermont-Tonnerre	United Kingdom
Last Flight Home		Ondi Timoner	United States
Love Life	ラブ ライフ	Koji Fukada	Japan, France
Malintzin 17		Eugenio Polgovsky, Mara Polgovsky	Mexico, Switzerland
Mammals (episodes 1–3)		Stephanie Laing	United Kingdom
Maya Nilo (Laura)		Lovisa Sirén	Sweden
More Than Ever	Plus que jamais	Emily Atef	France, Germany, Luxembourg, Norway
One Fine Morning	Un beau matin	Mia Hansen-Løve	France, Germany
Pretty Red Dress		Dionne Edwards	United Kingdom
She Is Love		Jamie Adams	United Kingdom
Tori and Lokita	Tori et Lokita	Jean-Pierre and Luc Dardenne	Belgium, France
Winter Boy	Le Lycéen	Christophe Honoré	France

==== Debate ====
English Title	Original Title	Director(s)	Production Country
Blaze		Del Kathryn Barton	Australia
Blue Island	憂鬱之島	Chan Tze-woon	Hong Kong, Japan, Taiwan
Bobi Wine: The People’s President		Moses Bwayo, Christopher Sharp	Uganda
Brainwashed: Sex-Camera-Power		Nina Menkes	United States
Call Jane		Phyllis Nagy	United States
Declaration	അറിയിപ്പ്	Mahesh Narayanan	India
Exterior Night (episodes 1–6)	Esterno notte	Marco Bellocchio	Italy, France
Hidden Letters		Violet Du Feng, Zhao Qing	China, United States, Norway, Germany
If the Streets Were on Fire		Alice Russell	United Kingdom
Klondike	Клондайк	Maryna Er Gorbac	Ukraine
Next Sohee	다음 소희	July Jung	South Korea
Palm Trees and Power Lines		Jamie Dack	United States
Stonewalling	石門	Huang Ji, Ryuji Otsuka	Japan
The Store	Butiken	Ami-ro Sköld	Sweden, Italy

==== Laugh ====
English Title	Original Title	Director(s)	Production Country
Chee$e		Damian Marcano	Trinidad and Tobago, United States
The Estate		Dean Craig	United States
Fast and Feel Love	เร็วโหด..เหมือนโกรธเธอ	Nawapol Thamrongrattanarit	Thailand
I Love My Dad		James Morosini	United States
Klokkenluider		Neil Maskell	United Kingdom, United States
The Middle Ages	La edad media	Luciana Acuña, Alejo Moguillansky	Argentina
Rimini		Ulrich Seidl	Austria, France, Germany
Sick of Myself		Kristoffer Borgli	Norway, Sweden

==== Dare ====
English Title	Original Title	Director(s)	Production Country
Butterfly Vision	Бачення метелика	Maksym Nakonechnyi	Ukraine, Czechia, Croatia, Sweden
Coma		Bertrand Bonello	France
De Humani Corporis Fabrica		Lucien Castaing-Taylor, Véréna Paravel	France
EO	IO	Jerzy Skolimowski	Poland, Italy
Horseplay	Los agitadores	Marco Berger	Argentina
Inland		Fridtjof Ryder	United Kingdom
Into the Ice	Rejsen til isens indre	Lars Henrik Ostenfeld	Denmark, Germany
Manticore	Manticora	Carlos Vermut	Spain
No Bears	خرس نیست	Jafar Panahi	Iran
Pacifiction	Tourment sur les îles	Albert Serra	France, Spain, Germany, Portugal
Shttl		Ady Walter	Ukraine, France
Subtraction	تفریق	Mani Haghighi	Iran, France
Unrest	Unrueh	Cyril Schäublin	Switzerland
The Woodcutter Story	Metsurin tarina	Mikko Myllylahti	Finland, Netherlands, Denmark, Germany
Xalé		Moussa Sene Absa	Senegal, Ivory Coast

==== Thrill ====
English Title	Original Title	Director(s)	Production Country
Ashkal		Youssef Chebbi	France, Tunisia, Qatar
The Blaze	En plein Feu	Quentin Reynaud	France
Boy from Heaven	صبي من الجنة,	Tarik Saleh	Sweden, France, Finland, Denmark
Emily the Criminal		John Patton Ford	United States
Faraaz		Hansal Mehta	India
The Good Nurse		Tobias Lindholm	United States
The Origin of Evil	L'Origine du mal	Sébastien Marnier	France, Canada
Señorita 89 (episodes 1 and 2)		Lucía Puenzo, Nicolás Puenzo, Jimena Montemayor, Sílvia Quer	Mexico
A Spy Among Friends (episodes 1 and 2)		Nick Murphy	United Kingdom
The Stranger		Thomas M. Wright	Australia
The Woman in the White Car		Christine Ko	South Korea

==== Cult ====
English Title	Original Title	Director(s)	Production Country
Attachment	Natten har øjne	Gabriel Bier Gislason	Denmark
The Kingdom Exodus (episodes 1 and 2)	Riget exodus	Lars von Trier	Denmark
Linoleum		Colin West	United States
New Normal		Bum-shik Jung	South Korea
Nightmare	Marerittet	Kjersti Helen Rasmussen	Norway, France
The Origin		Andrew Cumming	United Kingdom
Unicorn Wars		Alberto Vázquez	Spain, France
You Won't Be Alone		Goran Stolevski	Australia

==== Journey ====
English Title	Original Title	Director(s)	Production Country
After Sherman		Jon-Sesrie Goff	United States
Aisha		Frank Berry	Ireland
Alcarràs		Carla Simón	Spain, Italy
Autobiography		Makbul Mubarak	Indonesia, France, Singapore, Poland, Philippines, Germany, Qatar
Crows Are White		Ahsen Nadeem	United States
The Girl from Tomorrow	Primadonna	Marta Savina	Italy, France
High School (episodes 1–3)		Clea DuVall	United States, Canada
Know Your Place		Zia Mohajerjasbi	United States
Liquor Store Dreams		So Yun Um	United States
Nayola		José Miguel Ribeiro	Portugal, Belgium, France, Netherlands
The Passengers of the Night	Les passagers de la nuit	Mikhaël Hers	France
Shabu		Shamira Raphaela	Netherlands
Small, Slow But Steady	ケイコ 目を澄ませて	Shô Miyake	Japan, France
Summer with Hope	Tabestan Ba Omid	Sadaf Foroughi	Canada, Iran
Super Eagles ‘96		Yemi Bamiro	United Kingdom, Nigeria
Under the Fig Trees	تحت الشجرة	Erige Sehiri	Tunisia, France, Switzerland, Germany, Qatar
Utama		Alejandro Loayza Grisi	Bolivia, Uruguay, France

==== Create ====
English Title	Original Title	Director(s)	Production Country
The African Desperate		Martine Syms	United States
Creature		Asif Kapadia	United Kingdom
Fragments of Paradise		KD Davison	United States
Geographies of Solitude		Jacquelyn Mills	Canada
Getting It Back: The Story of Cymande		Tim Mackenzie-Smith	United Kingdom
God Said Give ‘Em Drum Machines		Kristian R Hill	United States
Leonora addio		Paolo Taviani	Italy
Meet Me in the Bathroom		Dylan Southern, Will Lovelace	United Kingdom
Peter von Kant		François Ozon	France, Belgium
Self-Portrait as a Coffee Pot		William Kentridge	South Africa, United States
Where Is This Street? or With no Before and After	Onde fica esta rua? ou Sem antes nem depois	João Pedro Rodrigues, João Rui Guerra da Mata	Portugal, France
The Worst Ones	Les Pires	Lise Akoka, Romane Gueret	France

==== Experimenta ====
English Title	Original Title	Director(s)	Production Country
100 Ways to Cross the Border		Amber Bay Bemak	United States, Mexico
Becoming Plant		Grace Ndiritu	United Kingdom, Denmark, Norway
The Blue Rose of Forgetfulness		Lewis Klahr	United States
Herbaria		Leandro Listorti	Argentina, Germany
The United States of America		James Benning	United States

==== Family ====
English Title	Original Title	Director(s)	Production Country
The Black Pharaoh, the Savage and the Princess	Le Pharaon, le Sauvage et la princesse	Michel Ocelot	France
Mini-Zlatan and Uncle Darling	Lill-Zlatan och morbror Raring	Christian Lo	Sweden, Norway
My Father’s Dragon		Nora Twomey	Ireland
My Robot Brother	Robotbror	Frederik Nørgaard	Denmark
Neneh Superstar		Ramzi Ben Sliman	France

==== Treasures ====
English Title	Original Title	Director(s)	Production Country
All That Money Can Buy		William Dieterle	United States
The Circus Tent	Thampu	Govindan Aravindan	India
Contras' City		Djibril Diop Mambéty	Senegal
Badou Boy		Djibril Diop Mambéty	Senegal
Eight Deadly Shots	Kahdeksan surmanluotia	Mikko Niskanen	Finland
Foolish Wives		Erich von Stroheim	United States
Kamikaze Hearts		Juliet Bashore	United States
The Passion of Remembrance		Maureen Blackwood, Isaac Julien	United Kingdom
The Queen of Spades		Thorold Dickinson	United Kingdom

=== Shorts ===
The short film programme was divided into the following seven sections.

==== Ritual and Magick ====
English Title	Original Title	Director(s)	Production Country
Flowers		Dumas Haddad	United Kingdom
I Have No Legs, and I Must Run	跑！跑！跑！	Yue Li	China
In Light		Alice Fassi	Bulgaria, France, Italy
Nant		Tom Chetwode-Barton	United Kingdom
Bird in the Peninsula		Atsushi Wada	France, Japan
Bucket in the Forest		Blaise Borrer	Australia
Frontier	Кордон	Tymofii Biniukov	Ukraine
The Ritual to Beauty		Maria Marrone, Shenny de Los Angeles	United States

==== This is Planet Earth ====
English Title	Original Title	Director(s)	Production Country
Skyward		Jessica Bishopp	United Kingdom
Silence		Arnas Pigulevicius	United Kingdom
Blue Room		Merete Mueller	United States
Forest Coal Pit		Siôn Marshall-Waters	United Kingdom
It’s Raining Frogs Outside	Ampangabagat nin talakba ha likol	Maria Estela Paiso	Spain, Mexico
Haulout	Выход	Evgenia Arbugaeva, Maxim Arbugaev	United Kingdom

==== The Flight or Fight Response ====
English Title	Original Title	Director(s)	Production Country
Tria		Giulia Grandinetti	Italy
Birds		Katherine Propper	United States
Groom		Leyla Coll-O’Reilly	United Kingdom
Back to School		Tyro Heath	United Kingdom
The Dependent Variables	Le variabili dipendenti	Lorenzo Tardella	Italy
Yung Michal		Štepán Vodrážka	Czechia
My Year of Dicks		Sara Gunnarsdóttir	United States, Iceland

==== Night Walks and Happy Never Afterse ====
English Title	Original Title	Director(s)	Production Country
Honey	Madhu	Tanmay Chowdhary, Tanvi Chowdhary	India
Outdoors		John Fitzpatrick	United Kingdom
Rosemary A.D. (After Dad)		Ethan Barrett	United States
An Avocado Pit	Um Caroço de Abacate	Ary Zara	Portugal
Curiosa		Tessa Moult-Milewska	United Kingdom
The Pass		Pepi Ginsberg	United States
Checoslovaquia		Dennis Perinango	Peru

==== Animated Shorts for Younger Audiences ====
English Title	Original Title	Director(s)	Production Country
Suzie in the Garden	Zuza v zahradách	Lucie Sunková	Czechia, Slovakia
I’m Not Afraid!	Ich habe keine Angst!	Marita Mayer	Germany, Norway
Aeronaut		Leon Golterman	Netherlands
Bellysaurus		Philip Watts	Australia
Zootopia+: "Godfather of the Bride"		Josie Trinidad, Trent Correy	United States
Bristles		Quentin Haberham	Netherlands
Hush, Hush Little Bear	Čuči čuči	Māra Liniņa	Latvia
Mr. Spam gets a New Hat		William Joyce	United Kingdom
Hello to Me in 100 Years		Wu-Ching Chang	Taiwan

=== Surprise Film ===
The Menu, dir. Mark Mylod

== Awards ==
=== Competition ===
- Best Film Award: Corsage by Marie Kreutzer
- Sutherland Award: 1976 by Manuela Martelli
- Grierson Award: All That Breathes by Shaunak Sen
- Immersive Art and XR Award: As Mine Exactly by Charlie Shackleton
- Short Film Award: I Have No Legs, and I Must Run by Yue Li

=== Audience ===
- Audience Award - Feature: Blue Bag Life by Lisa Selby, Rebecca Hirsch Lloyd-Evans, and Alex Fry
- Audience Award - Short: Drop Out by Ade Femzo
