= Seyni Awa Camara =

Senegalese sculptor (1945–2026)

Seyni Camara
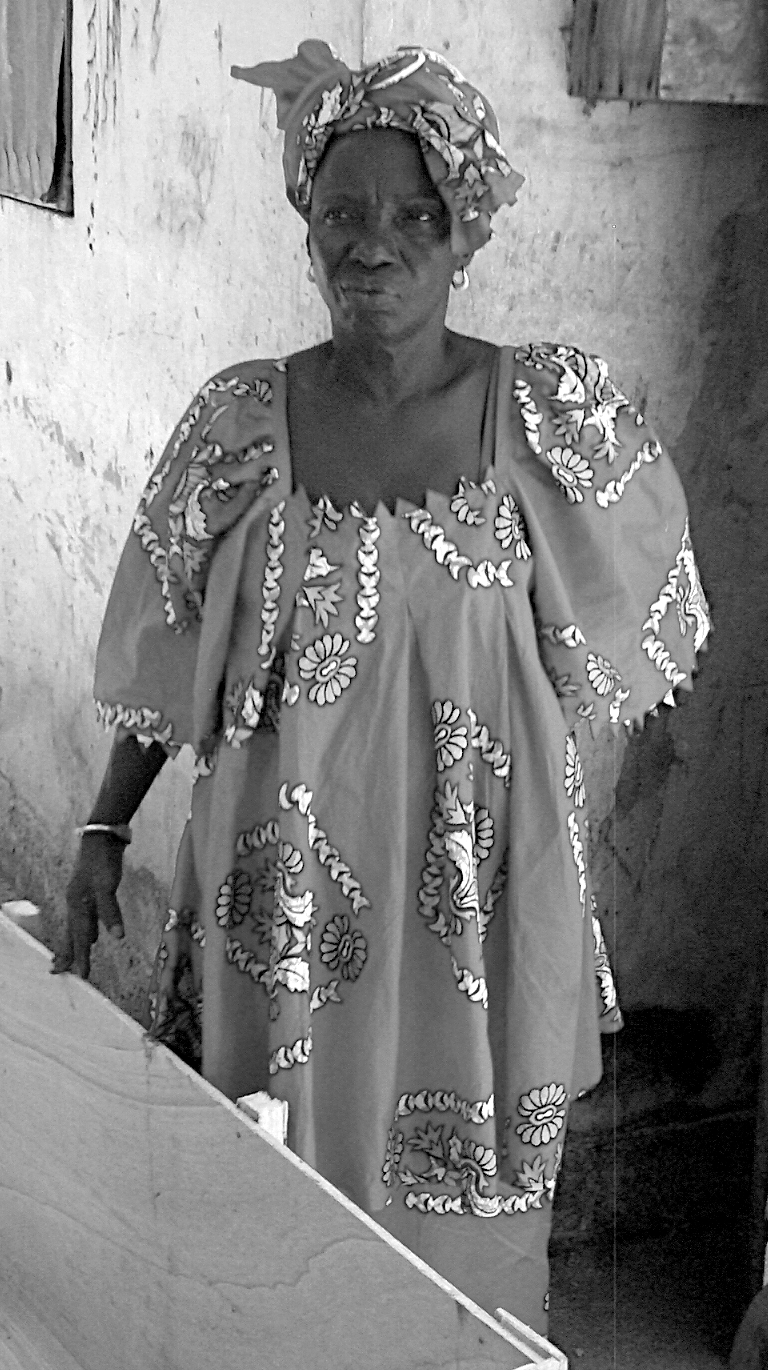
- Camara in 2008, by Sergio Pasini
- Born: 1945; Oussouye, Ziguinchor Region, French Senegal, French West Africa
- Died: 25 January 2026 (aged 81)
- Known for: Clay sculptures and statues

Seyni Awa Camara (1945 – 25 January 2026) was a Senegalese sculptor from the Jola ethnic group. She was born in Oussouye, Senegal, and resided in Bignona, where she worked with clay creating statues that range from 30 cm to 2.4 m (12 inches to 8 feet) tall.

== Background ==
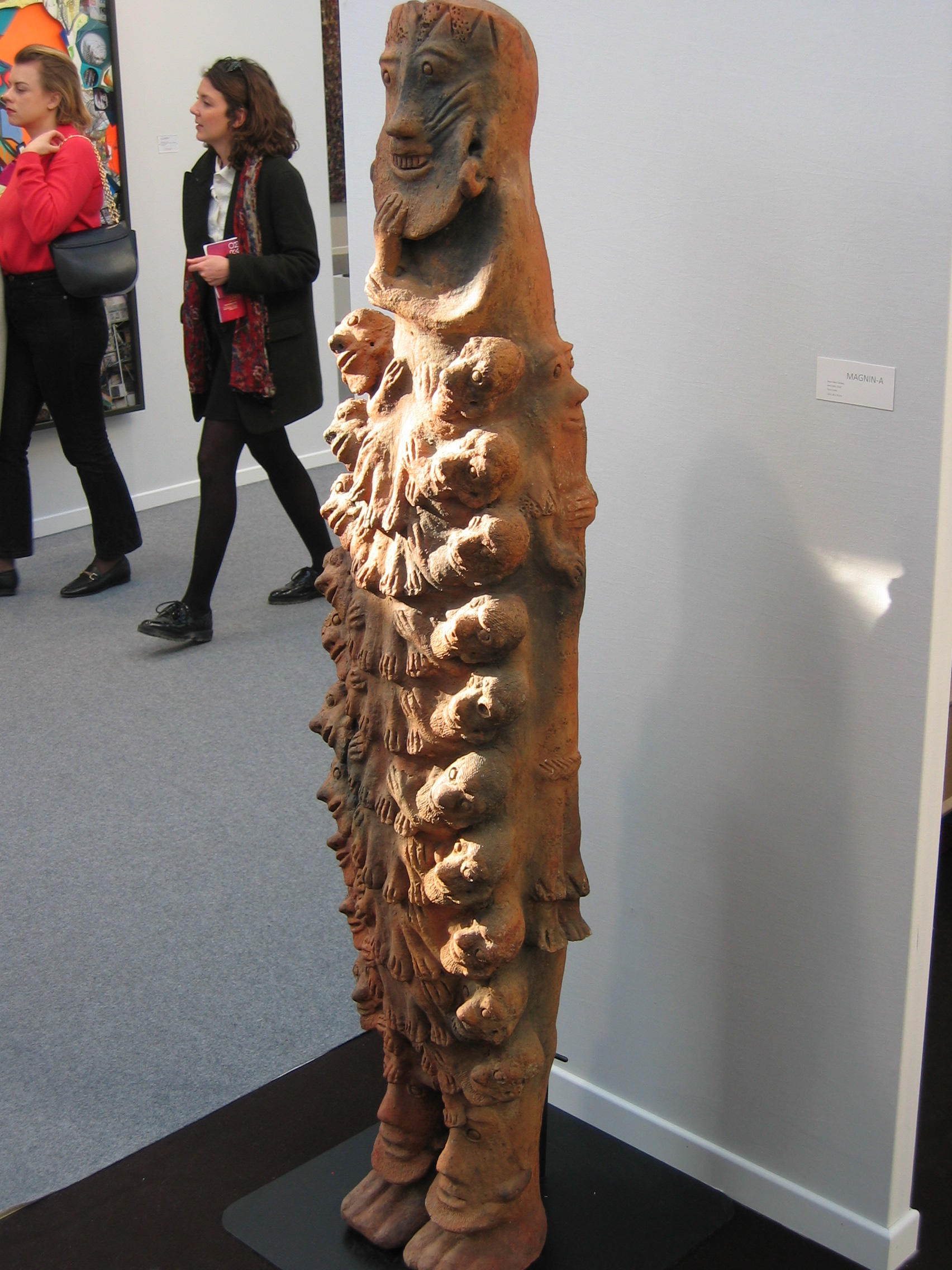
A statue made by Camara, 2017

Seyni Awa Camara's father, a man named Sousou, was originally from Guinea and moved to Ziguinchor. Her mother, a woman named Sereer, was from Oussouye, Ziguinchor Region, Senegal, where Camara was born c. 1945. It is unknown how many siblings she had, although it is known that she was the only daughter of her family.

According to Michèle Odeyé-Finzi, a sociologist, at the age of 12, Camara, alongside her brothers, wandered into the woods. After being lost for four months, she and her brothers returned within days of one another, each holding the same sculpture. Both Camara and her brothers claim that during their time in the woods, God taught them how to make statues and sculptures, such as the ones they brought home with them. In contrast, Moustapha Sall, an anthropologist, states that Seyni learned from her mother's practice of pottery as a child. Fatou Kandé Senghor, a Senegalese film director who knew Camara for several years and interviewed her, also agrees with this narrative, stating that the mystical tale of Camara being lost is a made-up narrative to appeal to White people who might buy Camara's work.

She was married to Samba Diallo until his death. Diallo had multiple wives, as his Islamic faith, which Camara shared, permitted. Those wives had children, but Camara struggled with childbearing and did not produce any biological children.

Camara died on 25 January 2026, at the age of 81.

== Artwork ==
Even though she learned how to sculpt and fire from her mother, Camara's art strongly differs from the typically functional pottery of the Senegalese region. She created figure-like sculptures ranging in size from 30 cm to 2.4 m tall, representing personal symbols. Her three sons help her fire them in an open hearth kiln before displaying them in and around her house. She authorized the use of bronze castings of her work since the terracottas are too delicate to travel.

=== Themes ===
Camara's art touches on many themes, most notably her struggles with childbearing and not having any biological children of her own. Fatou Kandé Senghor made a film on her entitled Giving Birth in 2015, based on her art, processes, and struggles relating to childbearing. According to Senghor, Camara created sculptures that represent her traumatic past, after being married at 15 and attempting to have children, which would later be the cause of her struggles with childbearing. Other themes can be seen throughout her sculptures, such as animals, religion, spiritual beings, marriage, couples, and family.

=== Exhibitions ===
Camara made her exhibition debut in 1989 in the Magiciens de la Terre, Centre Georges Pompidou show at the La Grande Halle de la Villette in Paris, France. Later, she had both solo and group exhibitions in France, Belgium, Italy, Spain, Norway, and other European countries. Camara's work has been exhibited in the United States only once, from 2005 to 2006, in The Contemporary African Art Collection (CAAC) of Jean Pigozzi. Most notably, Gallery Baronian in Brussels has organized several exhibitions of Seyni Awa Camara in 2020, 2021, and April 2024.
