= All Is Well (2011 film) =

- Portuguese: Por aqui tudo bem
- Directed by: Pocas Pascoal
- Written by: Pocas Pascoal; Marc Pernet
- Produced by: Luís Correia
- Starring: Catarina Avelar; Ciomara Morais; Cheila Lima
- Cinematography: Octávio Espírito Santo
- Edited by: Pascale Chavance
- Production company: LX Filmes
- Release dates: October 2011 (Rio de Janeiro); 2013 (Portugal)
- Running time: 94 minutes
- Countries: Angola; Portugal
- Language: Portuguese

All Is Well (Portuguese: Por aqui tudo bem, lit. 'Here It's Okay') is a 2011 film by Angolan filmmaker Pocas Pascoal. It was shown at the Malta Film Festival and Germany's Africa Alive Festival's 2014 edition. The film has a duration time of 94 minutes.

== Plot ==
The film deals with a pair of young, teen-aged sisters, the sixteen-year old Aida and the seventeen-year old Maria, escaping Angola to live in Lisbon, Portugal during 1980, in order to escape the Angolan civil war of that era.

The pair make it to Lisbon, where life proves to be harsh for the two African women. They have a hard time adapting to their new country and its customs and culture, but then a tragic event changes their lives once again.

== Cast ==
- Ciomara Morais as Alda
- Cheila Lima as Maria
- Willion Brandão as Carlos
- Vera Cruz as Alice

== Reception ==
All Is Well received mixed reviews from critics. Oscar Moralde of Slant Magazine praised Pascoal's depiction of the challenges of Angolan refugees and its impact on the bond between Alda and Maria. Moralde also praised the characterization of Alda and Maria themselves, writing that "Pascoal is steadfast in presenting Alda and Maria as people, not symbols". Robert Koehler's review for Variety was more critical, stating that the cast "lack[ed] a sense of character nuance" and criticizing the dialogue and filmography as unimpressive. Justin Lowe of The Hollywood Reporter wrote that while Pascoal accurately captured the difficulties of refugees, "the film's near-relentless negativity becomes wearying".

== Awards ==
The film won many international awards, including the:

- Los Angeles Film Festival, United States, 2012
- Khourigba African Film Festival, Morocco, 2012
- Karthage Afternoon Films Festival, Tunisia, 2012
- Festival Internacional de Luanda, Angola, 2012
- Fespaco de Uagadugu, Burkina Faso, 2013
- Festival Indie Lisboa, Portugal, 2013
