= Ndiritu =

Ndiritu is a Kenyan given name and surname. Notable people with the name include:

- Ndiritu Muriithi, Kenyan politician
- Grace Ndiritu (born 1982), Kenyan visual artist
