= Xalé =

- Film poster
- Directed by: Moussa Sene Absa
- Screenplay by: Moussa Sene Absa; Pierre Magny; Ben Diogaye Beye
- Starring: Nguissaly Barry; Ibrahima Mbaye Tché; Rokhaya Niang; Mabeye Diol
- Cinematography: Amath Niane
- Edited by: Pape Mbengue
- Music by: Henri Guillabert; Freres Guissé
- Production company: Les Films du Continent
- Release date: October 8, 2022 (BFI London Film Festival)
- Running time: 1h 41 mins
- Countries: Senegal, Ivory Coast
- Languages: French and Wolof

Xalé is a 2022 Senegalese thriller film directed by Moussa Sene Absa. It is the third film of the director's trilogy focused on women, following Tableau Ferraille (1995) and L'Extraordinaire destin de Madame Brouette (2002). In October 2022, the Oscars selection committee of Senegal announced the film as the country's submission to the 95th Academy Awards for Best International Feature Film.

== Plot ==
Set in Dakar in a time-shifting chronology, the film follows the story of two 15-year-old twins Awa (Nguissaly Barry) and Adama (Mabeye Diol). Awa is focused on her academics while her brother, Adama, hopes to emigrate to Europe. Following the death of their grandmother, they are put in the charge of their uncle Atoumane (Ibrahima M’Baye). In accordance with the grandmother's dying wish, Atoumane marries his resistant cousin Fatou (Rokhaya Niang). Her rejection of him prompts Atoumane to take out his frustration on Awa with life-altering consequences for both of them.

== Cast ==
- Nguissaly Barry as Awa
- Mabeye Diol as Adama
- Ibrahima M'Baye as Atoumane
- Rokhaya Niang as Fatou

== Release and screening ==
It premiered at the London Film Festival. The film was also screened at Adelaide Film Festival and Mill Valley Film Festival where it had its US premiere.
