= Fatou Kandé Senghor =

Senegalese film director

- Born: Fatou Bintou Kandé; 9 January 1971 (age 55); Dakar, Senegal
- Education: Charles de Gaulle University – Lille III
- Occupations: Film director, writer, photographer
- Years active: 1998-present

Fatou Bintou Kandé Senghor (born 9 January 1971) is a Senegalese film director, writer, and photographer.

== Biography ==
Senghor was born in Dakar in 1971 and grew up between Nigeria, Ghana, and Benin. Her father was a diplomat from the Casamance region. She studied film and English literature at Charles de Gaulle University – Lille III, and almost did not complete her degree because she was very involved in the artistic environment in Paris. Senghor first attended the Panafrican Film and Television Festival of Ouagadougou in 1992, as she had become a cinefile by that point. She considered not taking her final exams and enrolling in an art school, but decided against this.

Senghor graduated in 1993. In 1996, Senghor worked as a communications consultant for the World Bank. The following year, she found a job working on films and visuals for the National Council of Negro Women. From 1998 to 2000, Senghor was a visual specialist for the Goethe Institut. She worked in public relations at Suffolk University Dakar Campus between 2000 and 2002. in 2001 she founded the Waru Studio, a resource for artistic research using new technologies in Dakar. She envisioned it being a place of sharing for artists, but she became known as a "creator of opportunities", a label Senghor rejected. From 2004 to 2005, Senghor was the general manager for RADIO TOP FM 107.0 and was responsible for writing articles in several weekly newspapers. She is also a photographer and costume designer for the films Faat Kiné by Ousmane Sembène, Off Road by Berenghar Fall and Madame Brouette by Moussa Sène Absa.

In 2007, Senghor directed Diola Tigi, which provides an account of an ancestral initiation ceremony in the village of Baïla. In 2012, she directed The Other in Me, about the return to Africa of Etienne and Leopold Senghor, twin grandsons of the first Senegalese president Léopold Sédar Senghor. She described it as difficult to create, edit, and organize. Senghor directed Giving Birth in 2015. The film tells the story of ceramist Seni Awa Camara and her struggles with unsuccessful pregnancies. It premiered at the Venice Biennale, where it was well received. She published the book Wala Bok, une histoire orale du hip hop au Sénégal in 2015, examining the hip-hop scene through testimonials from rappers, managers and producers.

Senghor is married to Etienne Senghor and has three children. She lives between Dakar and Thiès. Senghor has an interest in challenging expectations and stereotypes regarding ancestral religious practices like Islam and Christianity.

== Filmography ==
- 1998 : Dal Diam
- 2000 : Tara the path of the World
- 2003 : Dona Ana Maria Cabral
- 2007 : Diola Tigi
- 2008 : My piece of poetry
- 2008 : The Return of the Elephant
- 2012 : The Other in Me
- 2013 : Malibala
- 2015 : Giving Birth
