= Une Affaire de nègres =

2006 Cameroonian documentary film

- Directed by: Osvalde Lewat-Hallade
- Screenplay by: Osvalde Lewat-Hallade
- Produced by: AMIP
- Cinematography: Philippe Radoux-Bazzani
- Edited by: Danielle Azenin
- Release date: 2006
- Running time: 90 minutes
- Countries: Cameroon; France

Une Affaire de nègres is a 2006 documentary film.

== Synopsis ==
March 20, 2000, a decree by the President of the Republic of Cameroon set up an Operational Command Unit to tackle rampant banditry in the Douala region. The Unit introduced what amounted to round-ups: in one year, 1600 people disappeared or were killed. One year later, nine young men disappeared. The matter was submitted to the UN High Commissioner for Human Rights. The accused were found guilty of "failure to follow orders" and released but legal proceedings have not come to an end. The victims' families have to live between the desire for justice and the pressure for the crimes to be wiped out forever from the collective memory.
