= Self-Portrait as a Coffee Pot =

- Directed by: William Kentridge
- Country of origin: South Africa, United States
- Original language: English

Production
- Producers: Joslyn Barnes; Noah Bashevkin; Rachel Chanoff
- Editors: Walter Murch; Janus Fouché; Žana Marović; Joshua Trappler
- Running time: 279 minutes
- Production companies: Louverture Films; THE OFFICE

Original release
- Network: MUBI
- Release: October 18, 2024

Self-Portrait as a Coffee Pot is a nine episode series created and directed by South African artist William Kentridge. In each episode, two versions of Kentridge discuss and argue a philosophical concern and demonstrate the creation of artworks. It was created over the course of two years during the COVID-19 lockdowns in 2020.

In an interview with T (magazine), Kentridge described the series as being "about giving a sense of the incoherent ways one’s mind works when making things."

== Production ==
Multiple-Oscar-winning U.S. film editor and sound designer Walter Murch supervised the editing.

== Distribution ==
Three episodes of the series were previewed at the 2022 Toronto International Film Festival, the International Documentary Film Festival Amsterdam, and the 2022 BFI London Film Festival. The series had its world premiere as a video installation during the 2024 Venice Biennale at the Arsenale Institute for Politics of Representation, curated by Carolyn Christov-Bakargiev.

Its acquisition by MUBI in March 2024 gave the company exclusive global streaming rights through the purchase of the first of a limited number of editions sold by the artist’s galleries Hauser & Wirth and Goodman Gallery. This was described as an "unprecedented combination of fine art acquisition and streaming rights.".

The series, along with many of the works that appear in the series, were exhibited at Hauser & Wirth gallery in Chelsea, New York.

== Episodes ==
No.	Title	Directed by	Original release date
1	"A Natural History of the Studio"	William Kentridge	October 18, 2024
South African artist William Kentridge investigates life in the studio. He imagines his studio as an enlarged head, where multiple dialogues occur between the artist and himself. Kentridge begins interviewing his double. Soon, the whole studio is populated by Kentridge’s many selves.
2	"Self-Portrait as a Coffee-Pot"	William Kentridge	October 18, 2024
William Kentridge explores the making of a self-portrait as a way of coming to know oneself. He also welcomes the dancer Dada Masilo into his studio. As Kentridge attempts to draw his own figure with a brush attached to the tip of a long stick, his double watches the imperfect outcome from afar.
3	"Vanishing Points"	William Kentridge	October 18, 2024
William Kentridge investigates how memory connects to place. Using two large blank sheets of paper, the artist draws a fictional colonial landscape, like those he remembers hanging in his childhood dining room. Meanwhile, his doppelgänger draws what he remembers actually seeing in Johannesburg.
4	"Finding One's Fate"	William Kentridge	October 18, 2024
Remembering a story his father told him when he was a child, of Perseus killing his grandfather by accident, William Kentridge reflects on the inescapability of one’s destiny. He explores the story of the Cumaean Sibyl, who revealed people’s fate inscribed on leaves that fell from a tree.
5	"AS IF"	William Kentridge	October 18, 2024
William Kentridge begins to paint black curved brushstrokes that align, but only from one point of view, into the shape of a horse. He debates with his doppelgänger, who sits on a tall wooden horse. The artist and a team of collaborators start to work on a large abstract sculpture.
6	"Harvest of Devotion"	William Kentridge	October 18, 2024
William Kentridge recreates rehearsals for previous performance pieces. He reads a phonetic poem with performers Hamilton Dlamini, Mncedisi Shabangu, Nhlanhla Mahlangu and Mica Manganye. In contrast, they read John Chilembwe’s 1915 letter to the Nyasaland Times, arguing for equal standing in Malawi.
7	"Metamorphosis"	William Kentridge	October 18, 2024
As William Kentridge explores metamorphosis, sounds are visualized through painting, a shadow turns into a sculpture, time morphs into a film strip, and an abstract blotch becomes an image. Meanwhile, the performers Joanna Dudley and Ann Masina act out a myth from Ovid’s Metamorphoses.
8	"Oh To Believe In Another World"	William Kentridge	October 18, 2024
Small paper puppets and actors wearing masks endlessly dance in a fictional Soviet museum as William Kentridge documents the making of his 2022 installation Oh to Believe in Another World, made in response to Symphony No. 10 by the Russian composer Dmitri Shostakovich.
9	"In Defence of Optimism"	William Kentridge	October 18, 2024
William Kentridge explores the optimism of making things—how, even in dire circumstances, there will be people who play, create, and sing. He enlists a local brass band to lead a jolly procession out of the studio and into Johannesburg. But will Kentridge’s two split parts come to an agreement?
