= Ciomara Morais =

Angolan actress

- Born: Otoniela Ciomara Correia Morais; March 14, 1984 (age 42); Benguela, Angola
- Occupations: Actor, producer, writer, dubbing artist
- Years active: 2005–present
- Height: 168 cm (5 ft 6 in)

Otoniela Ciomara Correia Morais (born 14 March 1984) is an Angola-born Portuguese actress with a Macanese descendant. Morais is best known as the director of the films Querida Preciosa, All Is Well and A Ilha dos Cães.

== Personal life ==
She was born on 14 March 1984 in Benguela, Angola.

== Career ==
In 2005, she made the acting debut with the television serial Morangos com Açúcar. In the serial, her role as 'Salomé' became highly popular and she received many roles in the upcoming years in television. Some of them include, role 'Leonor' in Diário de Sofia, role 'Masara' in Equador and then in Makamba Hotel. Meanwhile, she moved to theater plays with the debut play A Balada da Margem Sul directed by Hélder Costa.

She made her maiden cinema role in 2009 film The Abused with a minor role. Her first lead role in cinema came through critically acclaimed 2011 blockbuster All Is Well with the role 'Leonor'. She won the award for Best Actress at the Festival du Cinéma Africain de Khouribga (FCAK), Morocco and The Carthage Film Festival, Tunisia in 2012 for her role in the feature film All Is Well. In the same year, the film won the award for the Best Portuguese Feature Film at IndieLisboa International Independent Film Festival.

In 2012, she made her directorial debut and writing with the short film Encontro com o Criador. Meanwhile, she also voiced the animation film Nayola.

== Filmography ==
Year	Film	Role	Genre	Ref.
2005	Morangos com Açúcar	Salomé	TV series	
2005	Diário de Sofia	Leonor	TV series	
2009	Equador	Masara	TV mini-series	
2009	The Abused		Film	
2009	As Maltratadas		Short film	
2009	Makamba Hotel		TV series	
2010	República de Abril	Leonor	TV movie	
2011	All Is Well	Leonor	Film	
2011	Voo Directo	Rita	TV series	
2011	O Bar do Ti-Chico	Lola	TV movie	
2012	Com Um Pouco de Fé		Film	
2012	Liberdade 21	Jessica	TV series	
2012	O Grande Kilapy	Rapariga do Bar	Film	
2012	Encontro com o Criador	Viúva	Short film	
2013	Maternidade	Nené Cassamá	TV series	
2013	Camelia de Sangue	Abeona	Short film	
2013	Alma	Mãe	Short film	
2013	The Thorn of the Rose	Linette Oliveira	Film	
2014	Água de Mar	Mãe de Silvio	TV series	
2015	O Quimbo Cuia	Odete	TV series	
2016	A Única Mulher		TV series	
2016	Dentro	Iara	TV series	
2016	Um Dia	Sofia	Short film	
2017	A Ilha dos Cães	Lena	Film	
2017	Maison Afrochic	Neuza	TV series	
2018	Querida Preciosa	Preciosa	Film	
2022	Nayola	Rapariga	Film	
TBD	Já Te Disse Que Te Amo?	Sara	Short film	
