= Home Things =

Portuguese animated children's series

- As Coisas lá de Casa
- Created by: José Miguel Ribeiro
- Screenplay by: José Miguel Ribeiro
- Directed by: José Miguel Ribeiro
- Voices of: Marta Sousa Ribeiro; Maria Sousa Ribeiro
- Country of origin: Portugal
- Original language: Portuguese
- No. of episodes: 26

Production
- Producer: Luís da Matta Almeida
- Running time: 2.30 minutes

Original release
- Network: RTP2

Homes Things (As Coisas lá de Casa) is a Portuguese animated children’s cartoon series created by José Miguel Ribeiro. In 2003, the series was finally put under distribution rights around the world, by Alphanim. In March that year, RTP entered negotiations to acquire the series.

It aired on Teletoon in Canada in 2004 in its preschool block. The series was additionally sold to Yle TV2 and Disney Channel feeds in 47 countries across Europe and Asia.

== Synopsis ==
Short stories featuring by the objects and things you can find at home, accompanied by songs sung by two little girls.

== Episodes ==
1. The television and the aerial
2. The Vacuum Cleaner and the Rug
3. The Bucket and the Mop
4. The Cake and the Tin
5. The Boot and the Lace
6. The Umbrella and the Wellies
7. The Light and the Switch
8. The Things Inside the Handbag
9. The Toothbrush and the Toothpaste
10. The Knife and the Fork
11. The Pencil and the Eraser
12. The Books and the Bookcase
13. The Globe and the Magnifying Glass
14. The Nails and the Hammer
15. The Table and the Chairs
16. The Glasses and the Newspaper
17. The Brush and the Dust-pan
18. The Pan and the Whisk
19. The Two Pictures
20. The Clothes and the Pegs
21. The Telephone and the Directory
22. The Scissors and the Needle
23. The Toaster and the Toast
24. The Candles and the Candlestick
25. The Tea-cups and the Cabinet
26. The Photos and the Album
