= Rokhaya Niang =

Senegalese actress

- Born: Rokhaya Niang; Sénégal
- Occupation: Actress
- Years active: 2001–present

Rokhaya Niang, is a Sénégalese actress. She is best known for her critically acclaimed roles in the films Le prix du pardon, L'Extraordinaire destin de Madame Brouette and Teranga Blues.

== Career ==
In 2001, Niang started her debut cinema acting with the film Le prix du pardon directed by Mansour Sora Wade. With the success of the film, she was selected for the film L'Extraordinaire destin de Madame Brouette in 2002. Both films were selected for the Panafrican Film and Television Festival of Ouagadougou (FESPACO) in 2003. However, her most popular cinema acting came through the 2007 feature film Teranga Blues directed by Moussa Sène Absa when she played the role of 'Rokhaya'.

== Filmography ==
Year	Film	Role	Genre	Ref.
2001	Le prix du pardon	Maxoye	Film	
2002	L'Extraordinaire destin de Madame Brouette	Mati	Film	
2007	Teranga Blues	Rokhaya	Film	
2010	The Erotic Man	Himself	Film	
2011	Un pas en avant - Les dessous de la corruption	Dovi	Film	
2012	Accusé de réception		Short film	
