= Liquor Store Dreams =

Liquor Store Dreams is a 2022 documentary film which explores the relationship between two Korean Americans and their immigrant parents who own liquor stores in Los Angeles while also examining the complex relationship between the immigrant store owners and the communities they run their businesses in.
