= Maputo Nakuzandza =

2022 Mozambique film

- Directed by: Ariadine Zampaulo
- Screenplay by: Maria Clotilde Guirrugo; Ariadine Zampaulo
- Produced by: Juliana Brotto
- Starring: Domingos Bié; Maria Clotilde Guirrugo; Salvado Mabjaia
- Cinematography: David-Simon Groß
- Edited by: Bruno Teodoro; Ariadine Zampaulo
- Music by: Chico Antonio
- Production companies: Mariclô; Olhar Através
- Release date: January 2022 (Mostra de Tiradentes)
- Running time: 62 minutes
- Countries: Brazil; Mozambique
- Language: Portuguese

Maputo Nakuzandza (transl. Maputo, I Love You) is a 2022 Brazilian-Mozambican mystery drama thriller film written and directed by Brazilian filmmaker Ariadine Zampaulo. The film was officially selected for the international film premiere at the 34th International Film Festival Marseille. The film was also screened at the 2023 Berwick Film & Media Arts Festival.

== Synopsis ==
It's dawn in Maputo which is the capital city of Mozambique. Youngsters leave the nightclubs and in the backyards, women start their day. A man runs, a woman arrives from a trip, a tourist takes a walk, a worker takes the public transportation and the Maputo Nakuzandza radio station announces the disappearance of a bride.

== Cast ==
- Domingos Bié
- Maria Clotilde Guirrugo
- Salvado Mabjaia
- Fernando Macamo
- Eunice Mandlate
- Luis Napaho
- Silvana Pombal
- Malua Saveca
- Sabina Tembe
- Sabina Tembe

== Accolades ==
The film won Berwick New Cinema Award at the 2023 Berwick Film & Media Arts Festival. The film was nominated in the best international film category at the 2022 Valdivia International Film Festival. The film won the special jury prize at the 2022 Rio de Janeiro International Film Festival.
