= Tableau Ferraille =

1997 film

Tableau Ferraille is a 1997 Senegalese film written and directed by Moussa Sene Absa. Set in a seaside town near Dakar called Tableau Ferraille, or "Scrap Heap," the film depicts the political career of ambitious Daam, played by Ismaël Lô, who strives to save his town from the chaos which embroils much of Africa.
