= Suffolk University Dakar Campus =

Offshore unit of Suffolk University (Boston) in Senegal

Suffolk University, Dakar Campus
- Active: 1999; 27 years ago – 2011; 15 years ago
- Parent institution: Suffolk University
- Location: Dakar; 14°42′16″N 17°28′43″W

Suffolk University, Dakar Campus was a division of Suffolk University (of Boston, Massachusetts) in Dakar, Senegal. It was located on the grounds of the École Nationale d'Économie Appliquée (ENEA). The spring 2011 semester concluded its operations, with some students transferring to Boston to complete their studies.

== History ==
The Dakar Campus was opened in 1999 as a branch of Suffolk University. The campus was closed in 2011 after the university lost approximately $10 million on the venture, with the remaining 104 students at the Dakar Campus transferring to the main university campus in Boston.

== Programs ==
The campus offered English classes (ELI), as well degree programs such as the BA, BS, and BSBA.

== Dorms ==
Suffolk University Dakar had three dormitories. The main dorm was located on-campus, another in Arc en Ciel, and the third in Mermoz.
