= Osvalde Lewat =

Cameroonian film director (born 1977)

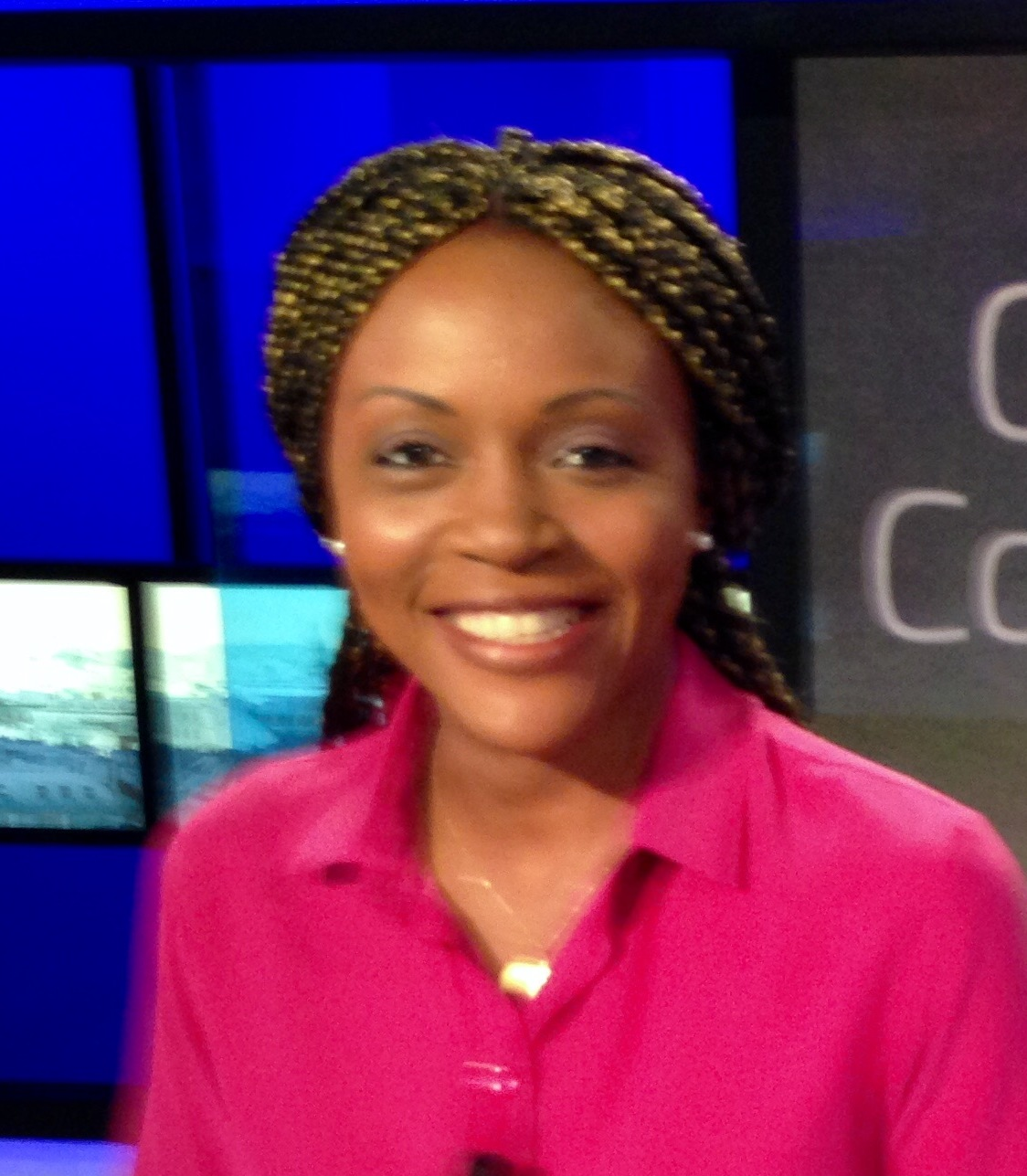
- Osvalde Lewat
- Born: 1977 (age 48–49); Garoua, Cameroon
- Occupations: Director, photographer
- Writing career
- Language: French
- Genre: Sociopolitical documentary
- Notable works: Black Business (2008), Land Rush (2012)
- Notable awards: Peabody Award (2012)

Osvalde Lewat is a Cameroonian filmmaker and photographer best known for her sociopolitical documentaries.

== Early life ==
Osvalde Lewat was born in Garoua, Cameroon, in 1977. She grew up in the city of Yaounde, where she fell in love with movies. She showed an early interest in photography, taking Polaroid photos of family members. Lewat studied in Paris at the Sciences Po. After graduating from the university, Lewat returned to Cameroon in 2000 to work for the Cameroon Tribune daily newspaper. She started making documentary films after several years of working as a journalist.

== Film career ==
Lewat studied film in Canada where she began her documentary filmmaking career. Her first documentary, The Calumet of Hope (Upsa Yimoowin), was filmed in Toronto in 2000. It illustrates the marginalization of Native Americans in America and won a human rights award at the Montreal World Film Festival in 2003.

=== The Forgotten Man (2002) ===
In 2002, Lewat directed the full-length documentary, The Forgotten Man (Au-delà de la peine), a story of a prisoner named Leppe who was sentenced to four years in prison for a minor crime. He remains in jail 33 years later, his family having given up hope of him ever being released. Lewat was awarded the human rights prize at the Vues d'Afrique festival in Montreal for the film.

=== A Love during the War (2005) ===
Lewat's documentary, A Love during the War (Un Amour Pendant La Guerre) was set in the Democratic Republic of the Congo during the First Congo War in 1996. The film reveals the widespread rape of women during the war and the government's silence on the issue. The documentary attempts to answer the question "What are the consequences when rape is used as a weapon of war?" The film portrays one victim's experience when she and her husband were separated during the war. "Aziza reunites with her husband in Kinshasa, but the memory of the horrors suffered by other women during the war still haunts her. Despite her husband's protests, she returns to Eastern Congo to find that the legacy of violence continues to infect the lives of women young and old. However, not everyone remains a victim as women have started denouncing the abuses they suffered." The film won the Human Rights Prize at the Vues d’Afrique Festival in Montreal.

=== Black Business (2008) ===
Lewat's 2008 documentary, Black Business (Une Affaire de nègres), centers on the political events that occurred in 2000 in Cameroon. A special branch of the Doula police, the Operational Command, are tasked with addressing the expanding problem of criminal activity in Douala. The special unit becomes responsible for the disappearance of a thousand men in a single year. In the film, Lewat interviews family members of the victims, political activists who speak out against the violence, and rare survivors of the mass killings. Lewant shows viewers the crime scenes, the villages where the victims were taken, and the places where the victim's bodies were found. The film was screened at Cannes and at the Vues d’Afrique Festival in Montreal. The documentary was nominated for the Muhr AsiaAfrica Award in 2008.

=== Sderot, Last Exit (2011) ===
This political documentary portrays the daily life of the film school of Sderot, located in the south of Israel, 2 km (1.2 mi) from the Gaza border. It explores the intersecting lives and views of Jews, Muslims, Christians, Palestinians and Israelis.

=== Land Rush (2012) ===
Lewat's film, Land Rush, is a BBC Storyville production. The documentary is one of eight films included in "Why Poverty?, a global debate about contemporary poverty hosted by the BBC, along with more than 70 broadcasters around the world. The eight films were screened at the same time in 180 countries.

Lewat's documentary investigates the purchasing of large acreages of farmland in Mali, by Saudi Arabian and Chinese businesses who build large agribusiness farms. The film tackles themes of food sovereignty, imperialism, modern poverty, and land ownership. Co-directed by Hugo Berkeley, the documentary won a Peabody Award in 2012."

== Film and television ==
Year	Film	Role	Notes
2001	The Calumet of Hope	Director	Short film Winner of Human rights award in Montreal
2002	The Forgotten Man	Director	Human rights prize at the Vues d'Afrique festival in Montreal.
2005	A Love During the War	Director	Special Jury Prize Vues d’Afrique and FESPACO 2005
2008	Black Business	Director	Nominated for Muhr AsiaAfrica Award (2008)
2011	Sderot, Last Exit	Director	Multi-language film: Arabic, English, French and Hebrew
2012	Land Rush	Director	Television documentary Winner of Peabody Award (2012)

== Photography ==
Since 2012, Levat's main focus has been on photography. Her work explores the idea of "otherness and ways of seeing". She has exhibited her work in Paris, the United States, and the Democratic Republic of the Congo.

=== Selected exhibitions ===
- Night Color, October 2015, Gallery Marie-Laure of Ecotais (Paris)
- Sky is Not the Limit, 15 August, New York City (USA)
- Katangese Poetry, February 2015, Dialogues Gallery, French Institute, Lubumbashi Zoo (DR Congo)
- ''Marges, June 2014, Gombe Hall and Place du 30 Juin (Kinshasa, Congo)

== Awards ==
- Nominated for the Golden Montgolfiere for best documentary for The Forgotten Man (Au-delà de la peine) 2003
- Nominated for Muhr AsiaAfrica Award (2008)
- Joint winner of Peabody Award for Land Rush (2012) with Hugo Berkeley
