= An Avocado Pit =

2022 Portuguese short film

- Um Caroço de Abacate
- Directed by: Ary Zara
- Written by: Ary Zara
- Produced by: Andreia Nunes
- Starring: Gaya Medeiros; Ivo Canelas
- Cinematography: Leandro Ferrão
- Edited by: Sara Marques
- Production company: Take It Easy
- Release date: 2022
- Running time: 20 minutes
- Country: Portugal
- Language: Portuguese

An Avocado Pit is a short film written and directed by Portuguese filmmaker Ary Zara. The film stars Gaya de Medeiros and follows an encounter between a transgender woman and a cisgender man over the course of an evening. The film was later executive produced by Elliot Page.

The film was shortlisted for the 96th Academy Awards in the Best Live Action Short Film category, making Zara the first transgender director to be shortlisted in that category.

== Premise ==
The story centers on Larissa, a transgender woman, and Cláudio, a cisgender man, who meet when Larissa approaches a parked car in which Cláudio is sitting. After a brief exchange, he agrees to drive her down the street. Over the course of the evening, the two converse, flirt, and gradually develop a connection.

== Production ==
An Avocado Pit was written and directed by Ary Zara. Brazilian actress Gaya de Medeiros made her acting debut in the film.

Actor Elliot Page later joined the project as an executive producer alongside Matt Jordan Smith and Tuck Dowrey through Pageboy Productions.

Zara stated that the film aimed to highlight positive experiences of transgender people, including joy, relationships, and everyday life, rather than focusing solely on violence or discrimination.

== Reception and awards ==
An Avocado Pit had its world premiere at the IndieLisboa in 2022, where it screened in the National Competition section.

The film received several awards at international film festivals. It won Oscar-qualifying awards at Outfest and the Guadalajara International Film Festival.

At the AFI Festival, the film received the Grand Jury Special Mention for Best Lead Acting. It also won Best Queer Short and the International Student Prize at the Festival du Court Métrage de Clermont-Ferrand in France.

During the awards season for the 96th Academy Awards, the film was shortlisted for Best Live Action Short Film, marking the first time a transgender director had been shortlisted in that category.

In a feature on Short of the Week, critic Mariana Rekka described the film as a drama about identity and connection set during a night in Lisbon. The review highlighted the performances of Gaya de Medeiros and Ivo Canelas, the film's visual style and color palette, and its focus on portraying transgender characters outside narratives centered on trauma.
