= José Miguel Ribeiro =

Portuguese film director (born 1966)

- Born: 18 January 1966 (age 60); Amadora, Portugal
- Occupation: Filmmaker
- Years active: 1994–present
- Known for: A suspeita (1999)
- Children: Marta Sousa Ribeiro; Maria Sousa Ribeiro
- Awards: Cartoon d'Or in 2000

José Miguel Ribeiro (Amadora, Portugal, 18 January 1966) is a Portuguese film director.

== Biography ==
José Miguel Ribeiro was born on 18 January 1966 in Amadora, Portugal. Just studying Fine Arts at the School of Belas-Artes from Lisboa and started working as a draftsman in 1990.

Start making a short animation in 1994 among the highlights O Banquet dóna Rainha and O Ovo. In 1999 done A Suspeita, short with which he was awarded 26 international awards, highlighting the Cartoon d'Or in 2000. In 2004, he made a cartoon series of 1.40 minutes Home Things that consists of 26 episodes, where the protagonists are the things that are in a house: the mop, the toothbrush, the glasses, the vacuum cleaner etc. The series was honored with several international awards.

== Filmography ==
=== Shorts ===
Year	Title	Work
2016	Fragments	Director, screenwriter
2016	Estilhaços	Director, screenwriter, editor
2015	Paso a paso...	Director, screenwriter
2014	20 Desenhos E Um Abraço	Director, screenwriter
2014	Papel de Natal	Director
2012	Amareloazulpretoamarelo	Producer
2011	O Sapateiro	Producer
2011	Independência de Espírito	Producer
2010	Desassossego	Producer
2010	Viagem a Cabo Verde	Screenwriter, producer
2009	Passeio de Domingo	Director
2009	My live in you hands	Producer
2005	Abraço do Vento	Director, screenwriter
2000	A Suspeita	Director
1994	O Banquete da Rainha	Director
1994	O Ovo	Director, screenwriter
1993	Os Salteadores	Animation department

=== Television ===
Year	Title	Work
2004	Home Things	Director

=== Films ===
Year	Title	Work
2022	Nayola	Director
