= Grace Ndiritu =

UK visual artist (born 1982)

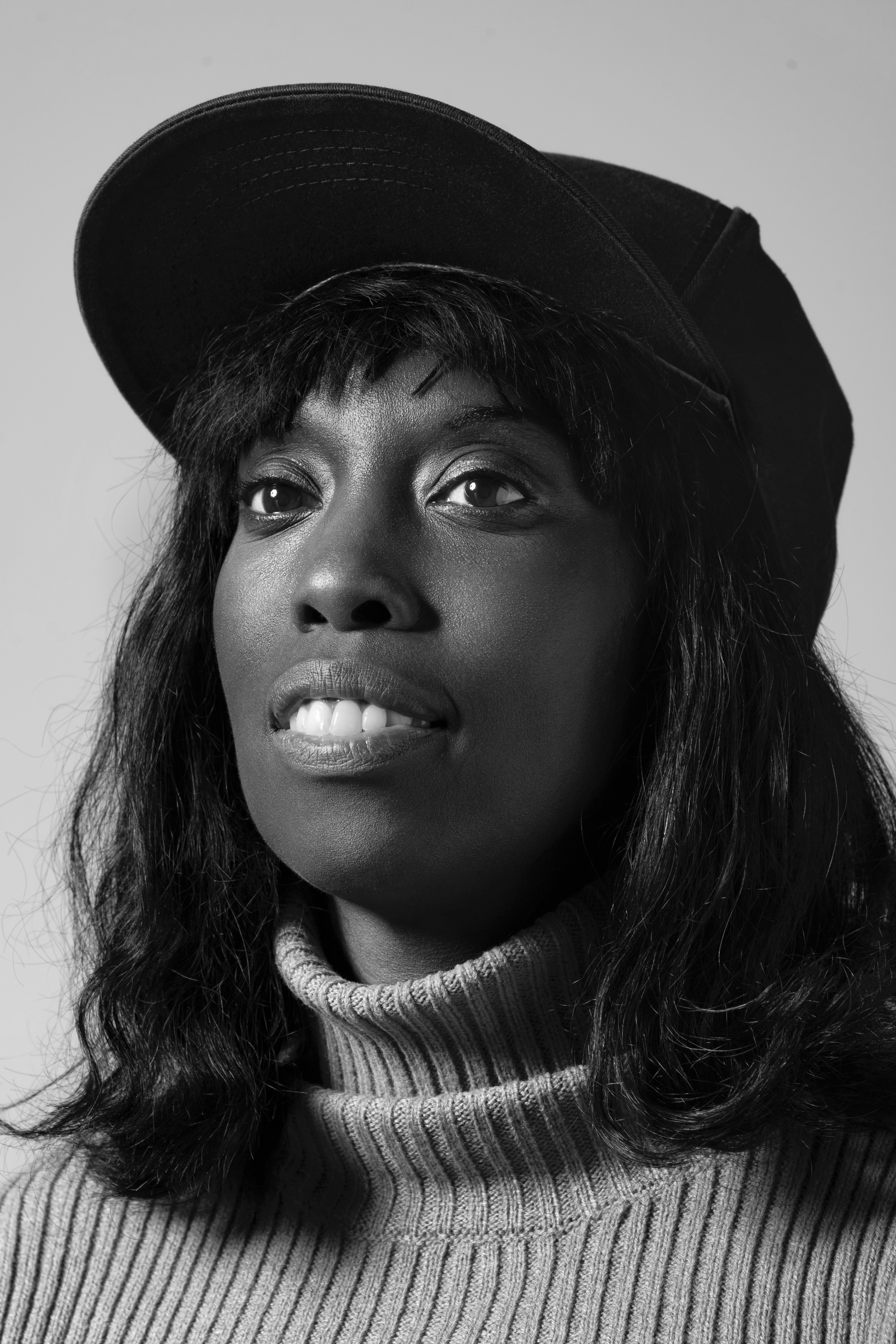
- Grace Ndiritu in 2022
- Born: June 1982 (age 44); Birmingham, England
- Occupation: Visual artist
- Notable work: The Nightingale; Still Life; Healing the Museum; The Ark; Coverslut

Grace Ndiritu (born June 1982) is a British-Kenyan visual artist.

She likes to incorporate shamanic ritual and meditation in her art, to bring about human transformation. She was the winner of The Jarman Film Award in 2022. and a recipient of the Paul Hamlyn Foundation - Visual Arts Award (2024). She has been featured on the "Louisiana Art Channel".

== Education ==
Ndiritu studied textile art at Winchester School of Art, UK and De Ateliers, Amsterdam. Her teachers included Marlene Dumas, Steve McQueen, Tacita Dean and Stan Douglas.

== Personal life ==
A result of this research was her ambitious post-internet living research/live art project, The Ark: Center For Interdisciplinary Experimentation, that took place from 1 to 10 July 2017. Her ideas between the rural and urban have also been documented in Whitechapel Gallery's publication: Documents of Contemporary Art: The Rural (2019) MIT Press.

== Work ==
In 2012, Ndiritu began creating a new body of works under the title Healing The Museum. The book 'Healing The Museum is the first monograph looking at Grace Ndiritu’s diverse practice over the last twenty years, published on the occasion of her mid-career exhibition at S.M.A.K. Ghent in 2023.

In 2019 Ndiritu led a group of museum directors, academics, activists and artists, in a reading group with meditation at the controversial Africa Museum in Tervuren, Belgium, as part of the conference Everything Passes Except the Past organized by Goethe Institut, on the restitution of objects and human remains from Europe back to Congo.

Ndiritu declared that 2020 was The Year of Black Healing. In honor of this, she led a year long programme of exhibitions, performances and talks in collaboration with institutions across the world, which was featured on The Sunday Times radio show with Mariella Frostrup and Elephant magazine. and BBC Woman's hour in 2023 for her billboard project.

=== Performance ===
In 2017 she was invited to give a talk on her work at Fondation Ricard in Paris, alongside other renown speakers such as Carolyn Christov-Bakargiev - director of Documenta 13 art exhibition and Fabrice Hergott - director of Musée d'Art Moderne de Paris.

She has also written essays about museums and exhibition making, Healing The Museum (2016), Ways of Seeing: A New Museum Story for Planet Earth (2017) and Institutional Critique: Racism & Spiritual Practice in the art world (2019). Her most ambitious shamanic performance to date, A Meal For My Ancestors: Healing The Museum, included staff members of the U.N., NATO and EU parliament, activists, and refugees at Thalielab, Brussels (2018). A briefing paper on climate change and refugees directly inspired by the performance, written by one of the participants, has now been published by the EU Parliament Research Services (May 2018). To date Ndiritu's performances have taken place at Fundacion Tapies, Barcelona (2017), Laboratoires d'Aubervilliers, Paris (2016), Glasgow School of Art (2015), Galveston Artist Residency Garden, Texas (2015), Museum of Modern Art, Warsaw (2014), Musee Chasse & Nature, Paris (2013), Centre Pompidou, Paris (2013).

=== Film/video ===
Her archive of over forty "hand-crafted" videos are largely held in the archive of LUX - British Artists Film/Video archive. Notably her video The Nightingale has been shown during the 51st Venice Biennale (2005) and is now housed the Metropolitan Museum of Art, New York. Furthermore, her video Still Life White Textiles (2007) has been used as a reference in art appreciation and art history classes throughout colleges and universities since 2010.

=== Photography ===
For an entire year 2023 to 2024 Ndiritu took over the Foto Museum Antwerp to create a 500 sqm architectural installation using 200 photographs from the collection entitled Grace Ndiritu Reimagines the FOMU Collection. Her own photo series A Quest For Meaning which was acquired by FOMU in 2022 was incorporated into its making. The exhibition was well received in the art and photographic international community alike including in "The Financial Times".

Since 2010, Ndiritu has been creating an encyclopaedic archive of images, entitled A Quest For Meaning (AQFM). It is a universal narrative, a creation story from the beginning of time. Told through photography, it tells "stories" between similarly disparate objects and events from the Big Bang until now, by conjuring up and making new connections between them. Closely connected to her interests in the moving image, the various themes in AQFM perpetually expand to create photographic constellations.

=== Painting ===
Ndiritu describes her method of painting as Post-Hippie Pop-Abstraction. It was used as the basis for her SWEATSHOP series of painting installations, which look at the idea of the sweatshop from three juxtaposing yet overlapping angles: Indigenous Tribes who are producing culture and spirituality to feed the New Age movement in the West; The Art Studio - artists who are making objects to feed the art market; Third World countries - where poorly paid workers make products to feed the luxury fashion global consumer market.

=== Research projects ===
COVERSLUT is a fashion and economic research project from Ndiritu founded in 2018. It focuses on dealing with issues of democracy, race, gender and class politics. It incorporates capitalist, pay what you can and ethical/environmental strategies into its economic framework. It is inspired by her own writings and thinkers such as Muhammad Yunus (micro loans), Charles Einstein (sacred economics), Vandava Shiva (economic feminism), and Stewart Brand (Whole Earth Catalog). Ndiritu's use of pay what you can in her own art practice has influenced several art institutions including Eastside Projects, Birmingham - Artists Led Multiverse Summit and Kunsthal Ghent's admission fee for their new building and Coventry Biennale, UK in 2019 - to adopt a pay what you can policy inspired by Ndiritu's ideas on institutional critique and structural change.

=== Writing ===
At age fourteen, Ndiritu was published by Oxford University Press. More recently Ndiritu's experimental art writing has been published by Animal Shelter Journal Semiotext(e) MIT Press.

Her political essays "A Call To White America: A Response to Donald J. Trump" (2016), "Notes To a White Left World: Activism in this Current Political Crisis" (2017), "Love in The Time of Trump: The Problematics of Kanye West" (2018) and "The Healing of America" (2020) are published online.

Her first book Dissent Without Modification published by Bergen Kunsthall, Norway (2021) is a critical theory book, made up of research interviews with radical, progressive, forward-thinking women who started their careers in the 1990s. It is a post-hippie, skate, surf, street, neo-tribal book on youth culture.

== Media coverage ==
In November 2021, Adrian Searle wrote a review for The Guardian praising Our Silver City 2094 and gave it four out of five stars.

In April 2017, Ndiritu was interviewed for The Most Amazing People about death, love, art, grief, and River Phoenix.

In 2014 she was named one of the "ten most important and influential artists under 40" by Apollo magazine in both their European and US issues.

In September 2014, Apollo magazine included Ndiritu in both their European and US "40 Under 40", an annual issue dedicated to the ten most important and influential artists under forty.

In 2011 Ndiritu's video Desert Storm (2004) was also compared to Titian's The Rape of Europa (1562), Delacroix's painting Death of Sardanapalus (1827), Goya's Disasters of War series of drawings and Gentileschi's painting Susanna and the Elders (1610), by Caroline Bagenal for Afterimage magazine.

== Exhibitions ==
Ndiritu's work is also housed in museum collections such as the Migros Museum of Contemporary Art Zurich, Foto Museum Antwerp, Arts Council England, Los Angeles County Museum of Art, British Council, London, Metropolitan Museum of Art, New York and Modern Art Museum, Warsaw. Her work is also in the private collection of King Mohammed VI, Morocco, as well as The Walther Collection.
