= Our Lady of the Chinese Shop =

2022 Angolan film

- Directed by: Ery Claver
- Screenplay by: Ery Claver
- Produced by: Jorge Cohen
- Starring: Claudia Pukuta; Moliteli Mokake
- Cinematography: Eduardo Kropotkine
- Edited by: Zeno Monyak
- Music by: Ismael Suama
- Production company: Geração 80
- Release date: 2022
- Running time: 98 minutes
- Country: Angola
- Language: Portuguese

Our Lady of the Chinese Shop is a 2022 Angolan drama film written and directed by Ery Claver on his directorial feature film debut. The film was set in the backdrop of Luanda. The film storyline is based on the colonialism, imperialism, religion and national malaise. The film largely portrayed novice actors who were largely unknown in film fraternity but were praised for their authentic performances despite lack of interaction throughout the film. The director of the film decided to take a subtle dig at China's gawing influence over Angola through this film by portraying the story of a Chinese merchant's opportunism. The film was produced by Geração 80.

However, the film was criticised for its slow phased screenplay, obscure plots and lack of dialogues but was praised for its visual storytelling and poetic narration with some critics calling the film similar to a documentary version. The film was screened as part of the First Feature Competition at the 2022 London Film Festival in October 2022. It was also screened in Red Sea Film Festival and at the Film Festival Gent. According to The Africa Report, it was ranked among top ten most notable African films of 2022.

== Synopsis ==
The characters have one thing in common as they encounter with a plastic statue of the Virgin Mary which was put for megasale by a power-hungry Chinese merchant. The Chinese merchant exploits the majority of Catholicism in Angola and intends to rake huge sums of profits through the Virgin Mary doll which was shipped into Luanda from an overseas nation and the Virgin Mary doll would soon go on to make profound effects on the inhabitants in Angola.

== Cast ==
- Claudia Pukuta as Domingas
- Willi Ribeiro as Zoyo
- David Caracol Bessa
- Liu Xuibing as shopkeeper
- Tobiasa the dog

== Production ==
The film was predominantly and entirely shot and set in Luanda. The principal photography of the film began during the middle of the COVID-19 pandemic in 2020 and the film was shot with just two main actors. The film was bankrolled by the Angolan filmmaking collective Geração 80 which was its second fiction feature film.
