= Pocas Pascoal =

Angolan film director

- Born: 11 November 1963 (age 62); Luanda, Angola
- Education: Conservatoire Libre du Cinema Francais (CLCF)
- Occupation: film director
- Years active: 1998–present

Pocas Pascoal is an Angolan film director.

== Early life and education ==
Maria Esperança "Pocas" Pascoal, was born on 11 November 1963 in Luanda, Angola, where she grew up until the age of 16 before leaving the civil war to Lisbon, Portugal with her sister. Two years later, she returned to Angola and became the first camerawomen for television in Luanda. In France, Pascoal studied at the Conservatoire Libre du Cinema Francais (CLCF) and graduated in film editing. In 2002, she joined a group of artists of the Cité internationale des arts and took part in several contemporary arts exhibitions. Currently Pascoal lives between Paris and Lisbon, where she is working on her next feature film that will tell the love story between a South African soldier and an Angolan.

== Career ==
In 1998, she directed her first short fiction film in India "For us" and two documentaries: Childhood Memories (2000) and There is always somebody who loves you (2004). She also directed and the short film Tomorrow will be different (2008). In 2011 she directed her first feature film Over here everything is fine, a story based on her exile from Portugal. This film received the Jury Award for Best Narrative at the Los Angeles Film Independent Festival in 2012. The film has also been produced under the name Alda and Maria which was released in January 2015. Her work has been featured in over 20 festivals worldwide since she began her career as a film maker.

== Filmography ==
- Childhood Memory (2000)
- There is always somebody who loves you (2003)
- Tomorrow will be different (2009)
- Por Aqui Tudo Bem / All Is Well (2011)
- Girlie (2017)

== Awards ==
- Best Film at the International Film Festival of Los Angeles
- Award for Best Film at FIC Luanda Angola Festival
- Price of the European Union at FESPACO
- Best film in the national competition at the International Festival of Independent Cinema IndieLisboa Lisbon
- Award for Best Actress at the Documentary Film Festival of Khouribga
- Best Actress Award at the Carthage International Festival
- Best Portuguese feature-length at the International Independent Film Festival (rtp.pt)
- Best Sound festival colors of Ethiopia

== Bibliography ==
- All is well: LAFF Review (The Hollywood Reporter)
- Berlin Premiere: „Por Aqui Tudo Bem“ (All is well, 2011)
