= Nayola =

- Theatrical release poster
- Directed by: José Miguel Ribeiro
- Screenplay by: José Eduardo Agualusa; Virgílio Almeida; Mia Couto
- Based on: A Caixa Preta by José Eduardo Agualusa & Mia Couto
- Produced by: Ana Carina; Arnoud Rijken; Michiel Snijders; Linda Sterckx; Geert Van Goethem; Serge Kestmont; Tomás Oom Martins
- Starring: Elisângela Rita; Feliciana Délcia Guia; Vitória Adelino Dias Soares
- Cinematography: Alex Debicki
- Production companies: Praça Filmes; S.O.I.L. Productions; JPL Films il Luster; Luna Blue Film
- Distributed by: Zon Lusomundo Audiovisuais
- Release dates: 13 June 2022 (Annecy); 8 March 2023 (France); 13 April 2023 (Portugal)
- Running time: 83 minutes
- Countries: Portugal; Netherlands; Belgium; France
- Language: Portuguese
- Budget: €3.2 million

Nayola is a 2022 Portuguese-language adult animated drama film directed by José Miguel Ribeiro in his directorial debut. It is based on the play A Caixa Preta by José Eduardo Agualusa & Mia Couto who co-wrote the script with Virgilio Almeida. It tells the story of 3 women from 3 generations who lived through the tragic period of the Angolan civil war. It is a co-production between Portugal, France, Belgium and the Netherlands.

== Synopsis ==
Three generations of Angolan women in a 25-year civil war (1975-2002). Nayola goes to the interior of Angola during the Civil War, in search of her husband who was reported missing in action. Somehow, three people inadvertently connect to this quest.

== Voice cast ==
The actors participating in this film are:

- Elisângela Rita as Nayola
- Feliciana Délcia Guia as Yara
- Vitória Adelino Dias Soares as Avó Lelena
- Marinela Furtado as Masked Man
- Raul do Rosário as Shooter
- Catarina André as Soldier Woman
- Ângelo Torres as The Boy
- Ciomara Morais as Rapariga
- Diogo David
- Correia Adão
- Adorado Mara

== Release ==
=== Festival ===
Nayola had its world premiere on June 13, 2022, at the 46th Annecy International Animation Film Festival, then screened on October 2, 2022, at the Hamburg Film Festival, on November 21, 2022, at the Bucheon International Animation Festival, on November 27, 2022, at the 33rd Singapore International Film Festival, on February 17, 2023, at the 42nd Brussels International Animated Film Festival, Anima and April 2, 2023, at the 47th Cleveland International Film Festival.

=== Theatrical ===
It was released commercially on March 8, 2023, in French theaters to then expanded to the Angolan market on March 31, 2023 and Portuguese market on April 13, 2023.

== Reception ==
=== Critical reception ===
Wendy Ide from Screen International wrote: "Nayola is bold and thrilling storytelling which combines its forceful message about the legacy of living through war with an almost mythic quality." Rob Alan from Backseat Mafia wrote: "Nayola is a moving animation which tracks three generations of women and the impact the war has on their lives [...] is impeccably made, featuring some inventive and beautiful animation."

=== Accolades ===
Year	Award / Festival	Category	Recipient	Result	Ref.
2022	Annecy International Animation Film Festival	Cristal for a Feature Film	Nayola	Nominated	
2022	Guadalajara International Film Festival	Best International Animated Film	Nayola	Won	
2022	São Paulo International Film Festival	New Directors Competition - Best Film	Nayola	Nominated	
2022	São Paulo International Film Festival	Best International Fiction Film - Audience Award	Nayola	Won	
2022	Silk Road International Film Festival	Best Animated Film	Nayola	Nominated	
2022	Bucheon International Animation Film Festival	COCOMICS Music Prize	Nayola	Won	
2022	Bucheon International Animation Film Festival	DHL Diversity Prize	Nayola	Won	
2023	Brussels International Animated Film Festival, Anima	Best Feature Film	Nayola	Won	
2023	Quirino Awards	Best Ibero-American Animated Feature Film	Nayola	Won	
2023	Quirino Awards	Best Visual Development	Nayola	Nominated	
2023	Stuttgart Intl. Festival of Animated Film	Best Animated Feature	Nayola	Won	
2024	Platino Awards	Best Animated Film	Nayola	Nominated	
