= Moussa Sene Absa =

Senegalese film director

Moussa Sène
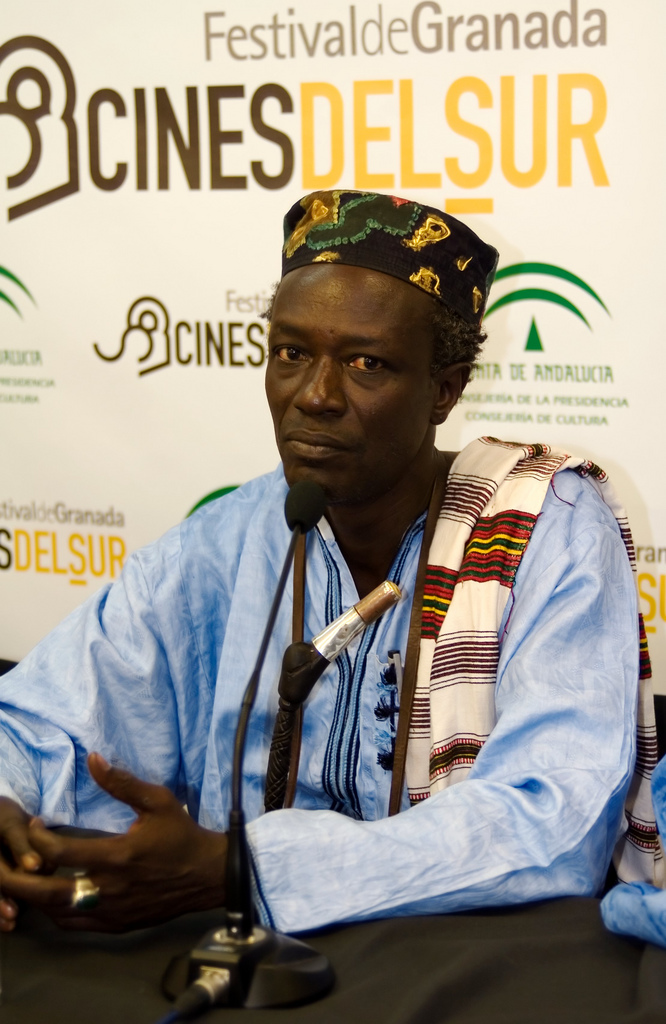
- Moussa Sène, Cines del Sur, 2007
- Born: Moussa Sène; 1958 (age 67–68); Tableau Ferraille, Dakar, Senegal
- Known for: film, painting, songwriting
- Movement: Art: surrealism, dada, African
- Awards: Silver Tanit, Carthage Film Festival (1988); Best Cinematography, FESPACO (1997)

Moussa Sene Absa, Moussa Sène Absa, or Moussa Sène Absa (proper name: Moussa Sène) is a Senegalese film director, editor, producer, screenwriter, painter and songwriter. He was born in 1958 in Tableau Ferraille, a suburb of Dakar, Senegal, to a Serer family.

== Film ==
Moussa Sène began his career as an actor, but eventually moved on to direct his own play La Légende de Ruba, which he also wrote. Moussa was honored for his screenplay Les Enfants de Dieu (The Children of God) at the Francophone film festival in Fort-de-France. His first film Le Prix du mensonge (The Price of Lies) earned him the Tanit d'argent (Silver Tanit) at the Journées cinématographiques de Carthage (Carthage Film Festival) in 1988 which propelled his career as a film maker. He went on to win several international awards in 1992 with his feature film Ça Twiste À Poponguine. His film Tableau Ferraille released in 1996 earn him several awards including Best Cinematography at the FESPACO in 1997. He was also the producer for Senegal Television's comedy series Goorgorlu (2002). Moussa has made at least ten Senegal related documentaries and he is the songwriter or co-songwriter for all of his films as well as the editor, producer, director and screenwriter.

== Art ==
Known for his films, music and documentaries, he is also a prominent artist whose works are exhibited in Senegal, Europe and North America (United States of America in particular) fetching thousands of Dollars. Moussa's art works are vivid and colourful, and have been exhibited since 1976. His style is inspired by the works of Rufino Tamayo and Joan Miró, with elements of the older African technique. Some of his art works have been exhibited at the Frieda and Roy Furman Gallery at Lincoln Center, New York City.

== Selection of work ==
=== Filmography ===
- 1988: Le Prix du mensonge
- 1990: Ken Bugul
- 1991: Entre nos mains; Jaaraama; Set Setal
- 1992: Moolan
- 1993: Offrande à Mame Njare
- 1994: Ça twiste à Poponguine; Yalla yaana
- 1995: Tableau Ferraille
- 1998: Jëf Jël
- 1999: Blues pour une diva
- 2001: Ainsi meurent les anges
- 2002: L'Extraordinaire destin de Madame Brouette (Madame Brouette)
- 2004: Ngoyaan, le chant de la séduction
- 2007: Téranga Blues
- 2010: Yoole
- 2010: The Lost Wings of Angels (documentary)
- 2020: Black and White (television series)
- 2022: Xalé

=== Art ===
- Telling Oracle
- A Lullaby For Massene
- Beauty From Tableau Ferraille
- Baay Faals In Paradise
- Clando
- Beggars In The City
- The Fiance
- Blues In Paradise
- Cops Of Another Time
