= List of Senegalese artists =

The following list of Senegalese artists (in alphabetical order by last name) includes artists of various genres, who are notable and are either born in Senegal, of Senegalese descent or who produce works that are primarily about Senegal.

== B ==
- Amadou Ba (born 1945) painter
- Seydou Barry (1943–2007) painter
- Joëlle le Bussy Fal (born 1958) sculptor, art dealer, curator

== C ==
- Seni Awa Camara (born c. 1945) Jola sculptor

== D ==
- Alioune Diagne (born 1985) Franco-Senegalese contemporary artist
- Delphine Diallo (born 1977) French–born photographer of Senegalese descent, living in Brooklyn, New York, United States
- Sea Diallo (1958–2025) painter, plastic artist
- Viyé Diba (born 1954) mixed-media artist, installation artist, performance artist
- Omar Victor Diop (born 1980) photographer
- Ndoye Douts (1973–2023), also known as Mohamadou Ndoye, painter

== F ==
- Abdala Faye (born 1971) mixed-media artist

== G ==
- Anta Germaine Gaye (born 1953) painter, sculptor
- Lalya Gaye (born 1978) Swiss-born digital artist, interaction designer who is of Senegalese and Swedish descent; living in the UK

== K ==
- Ibrahima Kébé (1955–2019) Soninke painter

== M ==
- Ismaïla Manga (1957–2015) Jola painter
- Kre M'Baye (1949–2014) portrait painter, educator

== N ==
- Adama Ndiaye, also known as Adama Paris, fashion designer
- Iba N'Diaye (1928–2008), Senegalese-born French painter; founder of Senegalese Modern Art

== P ==
- Jean Philippe Piter (born 1968) Senegalese-born French photographer

== S ==
- Henri Sagna (born 1973) sculptor
- Issa Samb (1945–2017; also known as Joe Ouakam) painter, sculptor, performance artist, playwright, poet
- Younousse Sèye (born 1940) mixed media artist, actress; described as "Senegal's first woman painter"
- Ousmane Sow (1935–2016) sculptor
- Oumou Sy (born 1952) fashion designer

== T ==
- Papa Ibra Tall (1935–2015) painter, weaver, illustrator
- Moussa Tine (born 1953) painter

== Z ==
- Zeinixx (born 1990) graffiti artist, activist, poet

== See also ==
- List of Senegalese
- Dakar School, art movement
