= List of Senegalese =

Flag of Senegal	Coat of Arms

This is a list of Senegalese people, organized by the field within which they are primarily notable. this list includes both native and expatriate Senegalese.

== Academics ==
- Rose Dieng-Kuntz (1956–2008), computer scientist
- Cheikh Mbacke, statistician
- Ahmadou Lamine Ndiaye (born 1937), veterinary scientist
- Tomas Diagne, biologist
- Tidiane N'Diaye (1950–2025), anthropologist, economist, and writer

== Artists ==
- Amadou Ba (born 1945), painter
- Seydou Barry (1943–2007), painter
- Seni Awa Camara (born ca. 1945), sculptor
- Abdala Faye (born 1971), born in Yene Guedj, near Dakar
- Ibrahima Kébé (1955–2019), Soninke painter
- Joëlle le Bussy Fal (born 1958), sculptor, art dealer, arts organizer, and art curator
- Ismaïla Manga (1957–2015), Jola painter
- Iba N'Diaye (1928–2008), painter
- Henri Sagna (born 1973), sculptor
- Issa Samb (1945–2017), also known as Joe Ouakam, painter, sculptor, performance artist, playwright, and poet
- Ousmane Sow (1935–2016), sculptor
- Papa Ibra Tall (1935–2015), tapestry weaver, painter, and illustrator
- Moussa Tine (born 1953), painter

== Athletes ==
- Pape Matar Sarr (born 2002) professional footballer. Born in Thiaroye
- Aliou Cissé (born 1976), football coach and former player.
- Amadou Dia Ba (born 1958), Olympic hurdler.
- Louis Mbarick Fall (1897–1925), professional boxer. Born in Saint Louis
- Demba Ba (born 1985), professional footballer. Born in Sèvres, France
- Ndiss Kaba Badji (born 1983), long jumper and triple jumper.
- Henri Camara (born 1977), professional footballer. Born in Dakar.
- Papiss Cissé (born 1985), professional footballer. Born in Dakar.
- Gorgui Dieng (born 1990), professional basketball player. Born in Kébémer
- DeSagana Diop (born 1982), former basketball player. Born in Dakar.
- Papa Bouba Diop (1978–2020), former footballer. Born in Dakar
- El Hadji Diouf (born 1981), former footballer. Born in Dakar.
- Patrice Evra, professional footballer. Born in Dakar.
- Tacko Fall (born 1995), basketball player. Born in Dakar.
- Keita Fanta (born 1981), judoka
- Morgaro Gomis (born 1985), professional footballer. Born in Le Blanc-Mesnil, France.
- Lamine Guèye (born 1960), Olympic skier. Born in Dakar.
- Yahiya Doumbia (born 1963), former tennis player
- Sadio Mané (born 1992), footballer. Born in Sedhiou
- Idrissa Gueye (born 1989), footballer. Born in Dakar
- Guirane N'Daw (born 1984), footballer. Born in Rufisque.
- Maurice Ndour (born 1992), professional basketball player. Born in Sindia
- Issa Ndoye (born 1985), goalkeeper for Senegal. Born in Thiès.
- Leyti Seck (born 1981), Olympic alpine skier. Born in Munich, Germany.
- Pape Cheikh Diop (born 1997), professional footballer. Born in Dakar
- Tony Sylva (born 1975), former footballer. Born in Guédiawaye
- Bacary Sagna (born 1983), professional footballer. Born in Sens, France
- Patrick Vieira (born 1976), former footballer. Born in Dakar.

== Authors ==
- Mariama Bâ (1929–1981), born in Dakar.
- Fatou Diome (born 1968), born in Niodior, Fatick region.
- Ousmane Sembène (1923–2007), born in Ziguinchor.
- Léopold Senghor (1906–2001), first President of Senegal, born in Joal-Fadiouth, Thiès region.

== Dancers ==
- Tamsier Joof (born 1973), born in London of Senegalese extraction.

== Film ==
- Ousmane Sembène (1923–2007), film director and producer, born in Dakar.
- Djibril Diop Mambéty (1948–1998), film director and actor, born in Colobane, Dakar.
- Safi Faye (born 1943), film director and ethnologist, born in Dakar.
- Dani Kouyaté, born in Burkino Faso.
- Moussa Touré (born 1958), film director and actor, born in Dakar.
- Moussa Sene Absa (born 1958), film director, painter and songwriter, born in Dakar.
- Marie Madeleine Diallo (born 1948), actress

== Historians ==
- Cheikh Anta Diop (1923–1986), born in Thieytou, Diourbel.
- Paulin Vieyra (1925–1987), born in Porto-Novo, Benin and raised in Senegal.
- Iba Der Thiam (1937–2020), born in Kaffrine

== Musicians ==
- Coumba Gawlo
- Souleymane Faye
- Mame Diarra Sylla
- Akon
- Didier Awadi
- Booba
- Abdoulaye Diakite
- Aïyb Dieng
- Mamadou Diop
- Samba Fatou Diouf
- Youssou N'Dour
- Habib Faye
- Mbaye Dieye Faye
- Nuru Kane
- Seckou Keita
- Mamadou Konte
- Ismaël Lô
- Cheikh Lo
- Baaba Maal
- Jimi Mbaye
- Alioune Mbaye Nder
- Viviane Ndour
- Doudou N'Diaye Rose
- Ismaila Sane
- Julia Sarr
- Mansour Seck
- Thione Seck
- Labah Sosseh
- Mola Sylla
- Mor Thiam
- Fatou Samba

== Politicians ==
- Adja Rose Basse
- Amath Dansokho
- Maïmouna Dieye
- Mamadou Dia
- Blaise Diagne
- Abdou Diouf
- Lamine Guèye
- Ségolène Royal
- Idrissa Seck
- Léopold Sédar Senghor
- Umar Tal
- Abdoulaye Wade
- Doudou Thiam
- Abdoulaye Bathily
- Mamadou Niang (military officer)
- Mamadou Niang (politician)
- Massata Samb
- Amy Ndiaye

== Others ==
- Dr. Daniel Annerose, businessman, born in Dakar
- Khoudia Diop (born 1996), model
- Amy Sarr Fall, Senegalese magazine founder
- Ndella Paye (born c. 1974), French Afro-feminist and Muslim theologian
- Cheikh Sarr, basketball coach
- Fatoumata Bâ (born 1986), tech entrepreneur
- Mbaye Diagne (1958–1994), military officer known for saving hundreds of lives during the Rwandan genocide
- Magatte Wade (born 1976), Senegalese politician

== See also ==
- List of writers from Senegal
