= Moussa Tine =

Senegalese painter (b. 1953)

- Born: 10 March 1953 (age 72); Ndiane, Thiès Region, Senegal
- Education: École Nationale des Beaux Arts (Senegal)
- Occupation(s): Painter, sculptor
- Movement: École de Dakar

Moussa Tine (born 1953) is a Senegalese contemporary painter and sculptor. He is part of the second generation of the Dakar School (French: École de Dakar), an art movement affiliated with Négritude.

== Biography ==
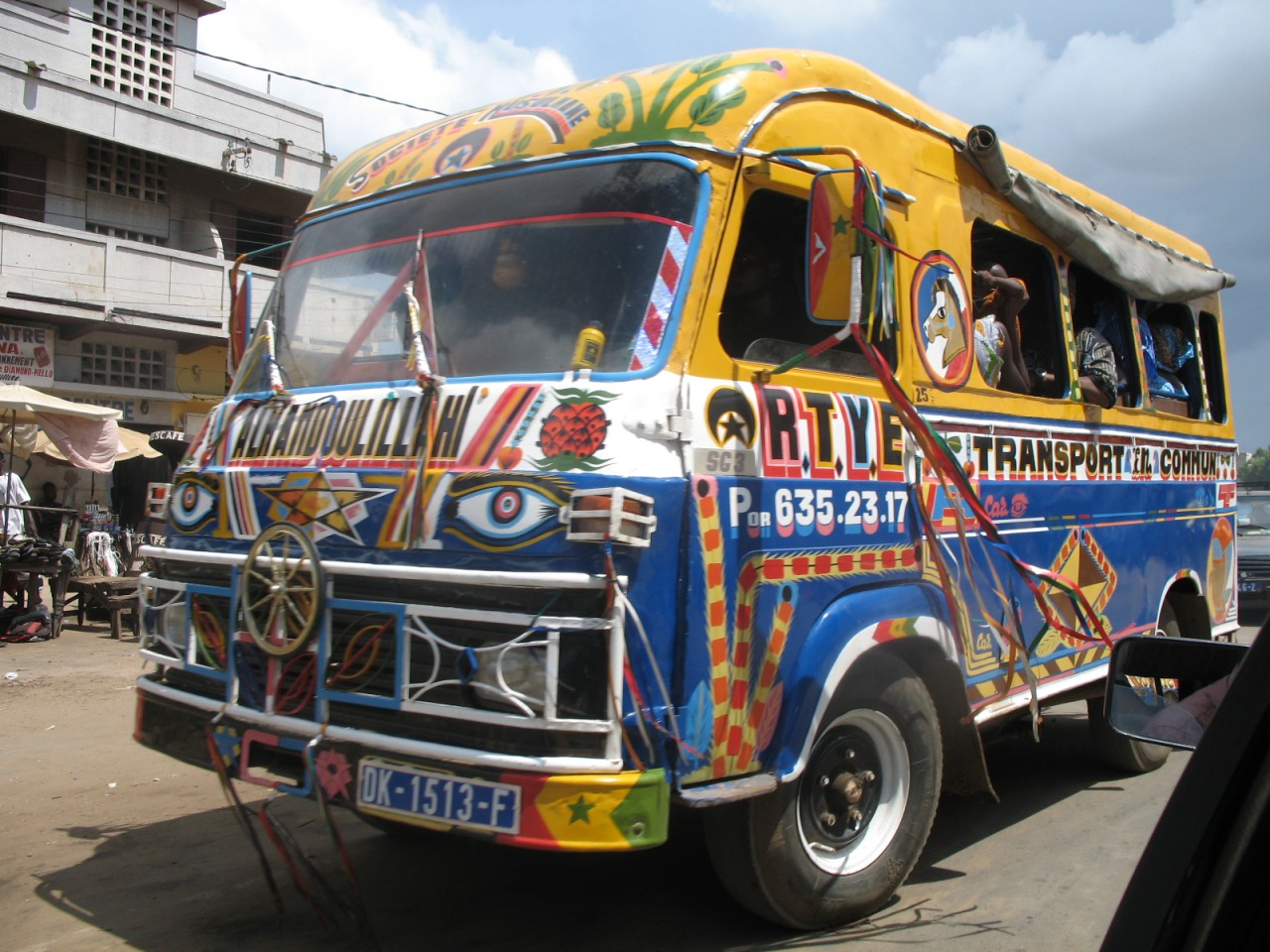
Example of a car rapide in Senegal

Moussa Tine was born on 10 March 1953, in Ndiane, in the Thiès Region, Senegal. His first job as a young boy was working as a ticket taker and announcer for car rapide (Senegalese mini buses). He started his pursuit of art in the 1970s by painting motifs and signs on the car rapide.

Tine furthered his arts education and graduated in 1978 from the École Nationale des Beaux Arts (Senegal).

His paintings have sculptural elements, and often contain discarded materials such as metal and wood. He was a founding member of ANAPS (Association of Visual Artists of Senegal).

In 1992–1993, Tine's work was included in the traveling group exhibition of fifty Senegalese artists called, Dream, Myth, and Reality: Contemporary Art From Senegal, sponsored by the National Gallery of Senegal in Dakar, and the Meridian International Center in Washington, D.C. In 2014, Tine's work was exhibited at the Tafeta in London, through the Mille Arts Foundation with part of the sales going to the Red Cross Ebola Outbreak Appeal.

== Exhibitions ==
- 1992, Peoples and Cultures of Senegal, group exhibition, Montpelier Cultural Arts Center, Montpelier, Hanover County, Virginia, United States; seven Senegalese artists exhibited, included Moussa Tine, Mamadou Fall Dabo, Viyé Diba, and Ibrahima Kébé
- 1993, Dream, Myth, and Reality: Contemporary Art From Senegal, traveling group exhibition, Afro-American Cultural Center (now the Harvey B. Gantt Center), Charlotte, North Carolina, United States
- 1994, Dream, Myth, and Reality: Contemporary Art From Senegal, traveling group exhibition, Marsh Gallery at the University of Virginia, Charlottesville, Virginia, United States; fifty Senegalese artists exhibited, included Moussa Tine, Mor Gueye, El Hadji Mansour Ciss, Tafsir Momar Gueye, Boubacar Coulibaly, and Mouhamadou Mbaye dit Zulu (or Mouhamadou Mbaye)

== See also ==
- List of Senegalese artists
- World Festival of Black Arts
