= Seydou Barry =

Senegalese painter (1943–2007)

- Born: 1943; Thilogne, Matam Region, Senegal
- Died: 21 August 2007 (aged 63–64); Dakar, Senegal
- Education: École Nationale des Beaux Arts (Senegal)
- Occupation: Painter
- Years active: 1963–2007
- Movement: Dakar School

Seydou Barry (1943 – 2007) was a Senegalese painter. He is part of the artistic movement called the Dakar School (French: École de Dakar), affiliated with Négritude.

== Biography ==
Seydou Barry was born in 1943, in Thilogne in the Matam Region of Senegal.

He attended the École Nationale des Beaux Arts in Dakar to study painting, and worked under artist Papa Ibra Tall. In 1963, Barry started exhibiting his own paintings.

Barry worked at the National Tapestry Manufacturers in Thiès (French: Manufacture Nationale de Tapisserie de Thiès) as a painter and cartoonist, from 1961 to 1965. His works and those of his co-workers were made into tapestries in 1975, entitled N'Danaane.

Barry died on 21 August 2007, in Dakar. A posthumous solo retrospective of thirty-five of his works, Seydou Barry Retrospective (2008), was held at Véma on the Dakar-Gorée pier. His work is part of the art collection of the Senegal government.

== See also ==
- List of Senegalese
- List of Senegalese artists
