= Ibrahima Kébé =

Ibrahima Kébé may refer to:

- Ibrahima Kébé (footballer) (born 2000), Malian football midfielder
- Ibrahima Kébé (painter) (1955–2019), Senegalese painter
