= Amadou Ba (artist) =

Senegalese painter (b. 1945)

Amadou Yéro Bâ
- Born: Agniam Thiodaye Matam; 1945 (age 79–80); Agnam Thiodaye, Matam Region, Senegal
- Other names: Amadou Yoro Ba
- Education: École Nationale des Beaux Arts

Amadou Yéro Bâ (born 1945), commonly known as Amadou Bâ, is a Senegalese painter.

== Biography ==
Amadou Yéro Bâ was born in 1945, in Agnam Thiodaye, Matam Region, Senegal. He studied engraving at the École Nationale des Beaux Arts (formerly known as the École des Arts du Sénégal) in Dakar. His studies continued under Pierre Lods (1921–1988; founder of the Poto-Poto School of Painting).

Bâ is often considered self taught in painting. His early work used India ink, and his later work was made with oil paint and/or acrylic paint. In the 1980s to 1990s, the primary subject of his work was focused on the Fulani herdsmen of West Africa, and contained imagery of nomadic life such as shepherds, oxen, flat-bottomed boats, rivers and dancers.

Bâ was one of the sixty Senegalese artists included in the group exhibition, Art contemporain du Senegal (1974–1982), which traveled internationally for two years; as well as the group exhibition Art senegalais d'aujourdh'ui (1974) at the Grand Palais in Paris.

== See also ==
- List of Senegalese
- List of Senegalese artists
