= Alioune Diagne =

Senegalese and French painter (b. 1985)

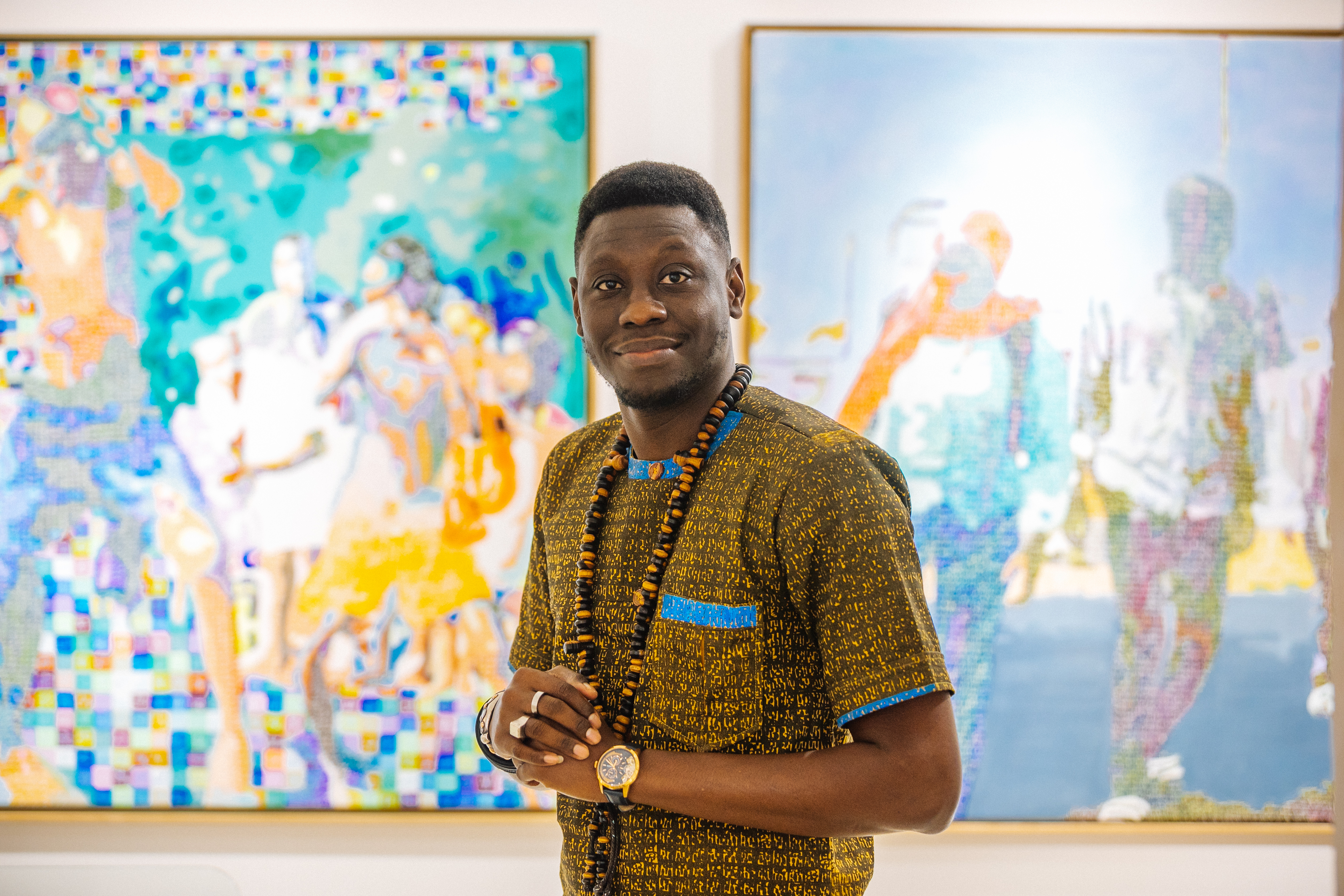
- Born: August 28, 1985 (age 40); Kaffrine, Senegal
- Citizenship: Senegalese, French
- Education: École nationale des arts du Sénégal - Beaux- Arts de Dakar
- Movement: Figuro-abstro
- Awards: The Norval Sovereign African Art Public Prize (2023)
- Website: www.aliounediagne.com

Alioune Diagne (born 28 August 1985 in Kaffrine, Senegal) is a Franco-Senegalese contemporary artist. He is known for developing the Figuro-Abstro movement, which combines elements of figuration and abstraction, incorporating signs inspired by calligraphic motifs. His work draws on scenes from everyday life, Senegalese traditions, and the experiences of African diasporas. He explores contemporary themes such as irregular migration, pollution and the exploitation of natural resources in Africa. In 2024, he represented Senegal at its first national pavilion at the 60th Venice Biennale.

== Early life and education ==
Diagne began drawing at a young age, using it as a means of expression. Although he had no access to art history or contemporary art during his childhood, his practice was influenced by Senegalese traditions and cultural heritage. In primary school, he would illustrate lessons on the classroom blackboard to assist classmates8, compensating for the scarcity of textbooks.

After the death of his father, Diagne moved to Dakar to join his mother and was admitted to the École Nationale des Arts (Dakar School of Fine Arts), where he received artistic training.

== Career ==
Diagne's artistic development continued in France after he moved to Vienne (Isère) in 2010. He became involved in community-based art initiatives, including workshops and projects with local children.

In 2013, he began developing the Figuro-Abstro style, which involves composing figurative scenes from numerous small abstract signs drawn in an instinctive manner.

He refers to his bodies of work as « collections » rather than « series », as it allows him to revisit themes intuitively without predefined constraints.

His early collections include Scènes de marchés sénégalais (senegalese market scenes) and Modou Modou, the latter focusing on the daily life of Senegalese migrant workers.

At that time, his work was exhibited in international venues such as Shanghai and Aosta. In 2019, he presented an exhibition titled Perceptions in Paris which brought together several of his collections.

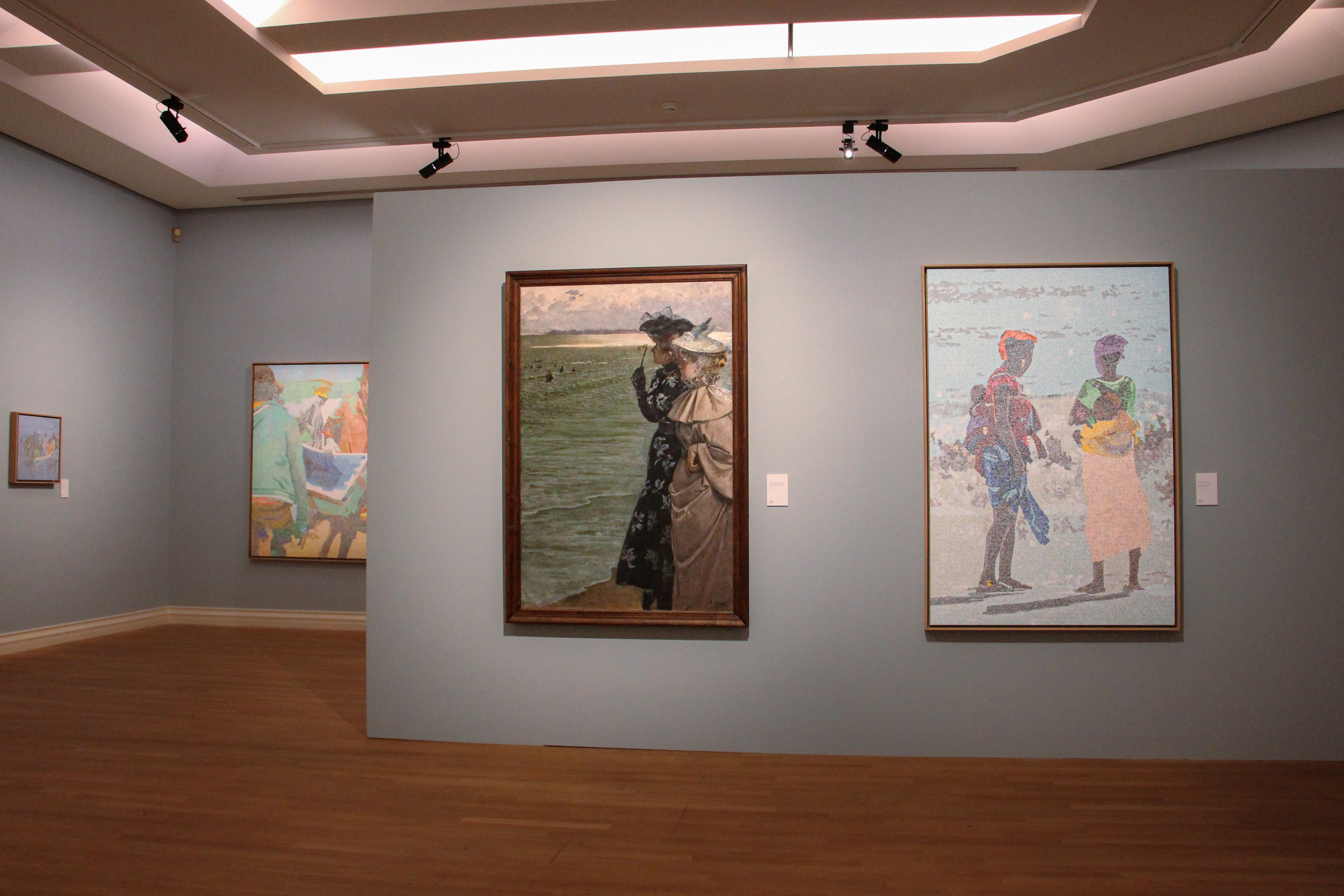
Solo Show "Ndox-Glint » in dialog with impressionism, Musée des Beaux-Arts, Rouen, France

In 2022, Diagne participated in the Dak'Art Biennale of Contemporary African Art, exhibiting at the former Dakar Old Courthouse. He also held a solo exhibition at the Grand Théâtre National de Dakar titled Ëttu Kër – Inner Courtyard, inspired by colonial-era postcards and traditional Senegalese customs. That year, the Museum of Black Civilizations in Dakar acquired one of his works, and he became represented by the Daniel Templon Gallery Between 2023 and 2024, the Musée des Beaux-Arts in Rouen presented a solo exhibition of his work, Ndox – Glint, centered on the theme of river. This project led Diagne to travel through towns and villages along the Senegal river. The exhibition created a dialogue between his work and that of impressionist painters such as Claude Monet, Eugène Boudin or Robert Antoine Pinchon. Following this period, he returned to live in Senegal and established a studio there.

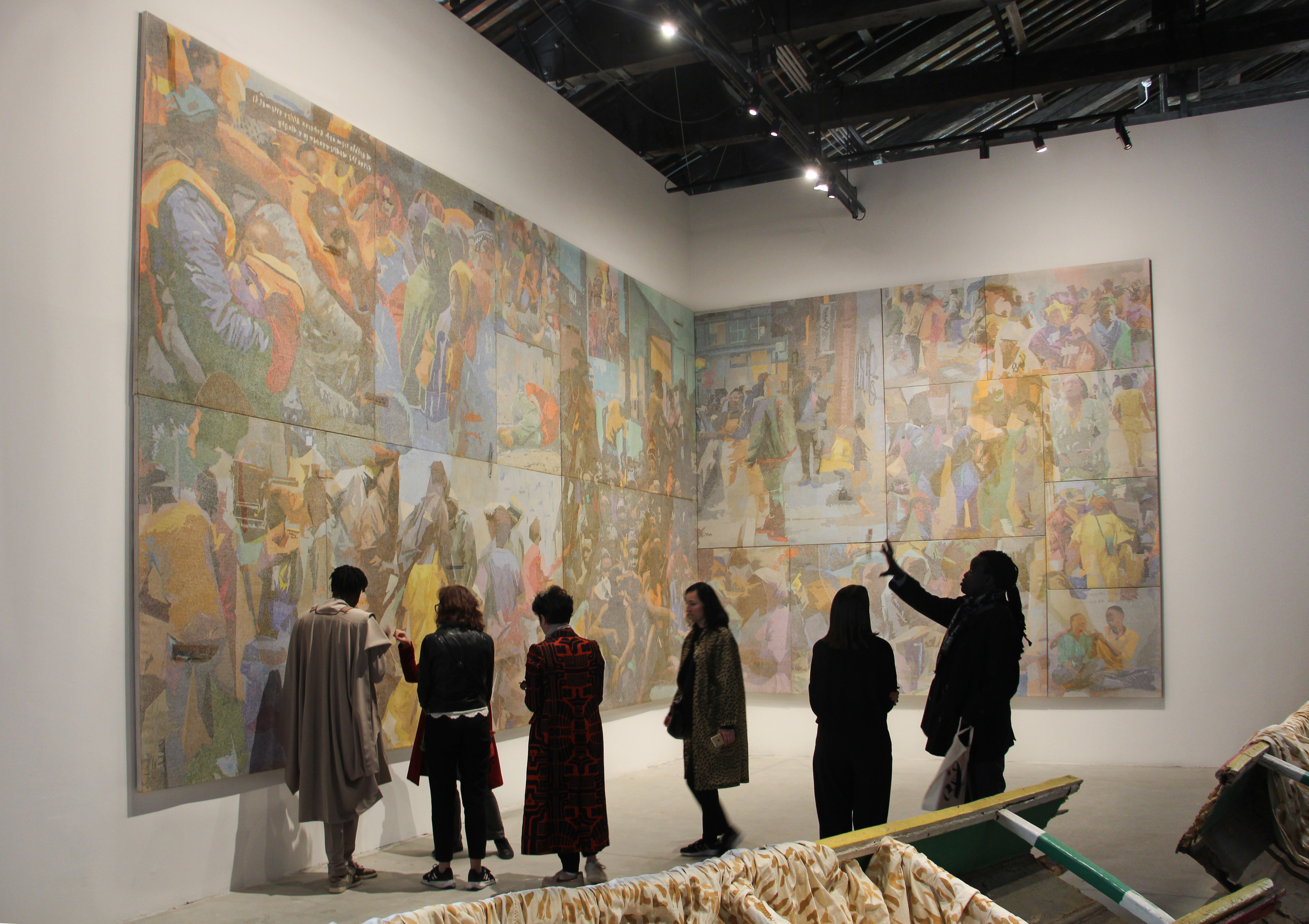
Solo show "Bokk – Bounds", Senegalese Pavilion, 60e Venice Biennale, Venice, Italy

In April 2024, Diagne represented Senegal at the country's inaugural national pavilion at the Venice Biennale. His project, Bokk – Bounds, was presented in collaboration with curator Massamba Mbaye, responding to the Biennale's theme Stranieri Ovunque – Foreigners Everywhere. The term Bokk, in Wolof, refers to shared values and family bonds. The installation included sixteen paintings forming a 4×12 meter display and a traditional pirogue wrapped in hand-painted Senegalese fabric, symbolizing ruptured human connections and migratory flows.

In parallel, Diagne exhibited with Daniel Templon Gallery in Paris, Brussels, and New York. In 2024, he presented Seede ("testimony" in Wolof) in Paris, addressing the human toll of irregular migration across the Mediterranean. His work often depicts maritime rescues, a recurring theme.

His paintings have been acquired by institutions such as the Denver Art Museum and other international collections.

== Figuro-abstro style ==
Diagne developed the Figuro-Abstro style in 2013, following the death of his grandfather, a Quranic master, from whom he takes his name. The style consists of portraits and scenes constructed from small, calligraphic-like signs. For Diagne, these signs emerged intuitively and serve as a universal languageexpressing emotions and fragments of memory. The viewer is encouraged to observe the work from different angles to gradually discern the subject.

Some art critics and curators have noted similarities between his work and movements such as Pointillism and Impressionism, although he developed his style before discovering them. After his exhibition at the Musée des Beaux-Arts in Rouen, he became more interested in these European influences, which have since shaped aspects of his work.

His later influences include Cubism and Picasso's works referencing African masks, discovered during museum visits in Europe and in the United States.

The Figuro-Abstro approach has since inspired other artists.

== Artistic Themes ==
Diagne's work addresses various contemporary issues, including ecology, the role of women in society, racism, and questions of cultural transmission and heritage.Environmental concerns appear frequently in his work, particularly the pollution of oceans and the depletion of marine resources along the African coast, often attributed to foreign exploitation and its impact on local fishing communities. Several of his paintings also depict scenes related to racial discrimination.

Themes of exile and the everyday lives of African diasporas are also central in his practice. In 2023, while preparing an exhibition on the Senegal River for the Musée des Beaux-Arts in Rouen, he traveled along the river and met former fishermen who had become involved in migrant smuggling. His work often reflects on the dangers of irregular migration across the Mediterranean, a subject he has explored in several paintings. Some paintings seek to raise awareness among Senegalese and African youth about the risks involved and the challenges faced by migrants in Europe.

Diagne regularly portrays modou-modou - Senegalese migrant workers living abroad, depicting their lives between cities such as Paris or New York and their connections to Senegal. These works often combine urban European environments with visual references to their cultural origins.

Scenes from Senegalese daily life also feature prominently in his work, including market scenes, depictions of senegalese youth, and representations of active women in community role.His paintings incorporate references to Senegalese traditions and practices, with the aim of documenting a culture in transition and preserving elements that risk being forgotten.

== Exhibitions ==
=== Solo Shows ===
- 2025 : « Jokkoo », Galerie Templon, New York (USA)
- 2024 : "Bokk - Bounds", Senegalese Pavilion, Biennale di Venezia, Arsenale, Venice (Italy)
- 2024 : "Seede" (Witness), Galerie Templon, Paris (France)
- 2023 : "Ndox-Glint", Musée des Beaux-Arts de Rouen, Rouen (France)
- 2023 : "Tukki", Galerie Templon, Brussels (Belgium)
- 2022 : "Ëttu Kër - Cour intérieure", Grand Théâtre National de Dakar – Special Pavilion at the Dakar Biennale (Senegal)
- 2020 : "WONEMA – Let me see", Dakar (Senegal)
- 2019 : "PERCEPTIONS", We Art Partners, Paris (France)
- 2017 : "Un nouveau regard", Finaosta Exhibition Hall, Aosta (Italy)
- 2017 : Solo exhibition during ArtBasel, Basel (Switzerland)

=== Group Shows ===
- 2024 : Senegal Pavilion, Dakar Biennale, Musée des Civilisations Noires, Dakar (Senegal)
- 2023 : Africa Supernova, Kunsthal KAdE, Amersfoort (Netherlands)
- 2023 : Norval Sovereign Art Prize 2023, Norval Foundation, Cape Town (South Africa)
- 2022 : Official selection of the Dakar Biennale, Palais de Justice, Dakar (Senegal)
- 2019 : Hommage à Fatma Charfi, Galerie Nationale, Dakar (Senegal)
- 2016 : Galerie Pélussin (France)
- 2016 : Galerie Artbank, Shanghai (China)
- 2016 : Galerie Arte, Dakar (Senegal)
- 2016 : Biennale Off Dak'Art 2016, Loman (Senegal)
- 2015 : Salon African Art Fair, Paris (France)
- 2014 :11e Biennale de Dakar, Saint-Louis (Senegal)
- 2014 : Sink or Swim, 11e Biennale de Dakar, Villa Spivey, Dakar (Senegal)
- 2014 : Figuro Abstro, Galerie Rêves d'Afrique, Saint-Étienne (France)
- 2014 : Itinéraire en Couleurs, Espace Jean Drevon (France)
- 2013 : 10e édition, hall de l'hôpital Lucien Hussel, Vienne (France)
- 2013 : Collabor'Action, Galerie Loman Art, Dakar (Sénégal)

== Collections ==
- Domaine Privé de l'Etat du Sénégal, Museum of Black Civilizations
- Denver Art Museum
- Saudi Arabia Museum of Contemporary Art
- Schulting Collection
- Artistic Museum of Contemporary Art (AMOCA), Cardiff
- Schneider Foundation, Wattwiller

== Publications ==
- Dagen, Philippe ; Mbaye, Massamba. Bokk-Bounds, BiennalediVenezia. Les presses du réel : Paris, 2024
- Calame-Levert, Florence ; Chaizemartin, Julie. Alioune Diagne Ndox-Glint - Musée des Beaux-Arts de Rouen. Galerie Templon : Paris, 2022
- Ëttu Kër – Cour intérieure - Grand Théâtre National de Dakar. We Art Partners : Paris, 2022.
- Alioune Diagne, PERCEPTIONS. Éditions Internationales du Patrimoine : Paris, 2019
- Galerie Nationale ; Ndiaye Abdou Diouf. Hommage à Fatma Charfi par les artistes sénégalais.Fatma Charfi Association : Dakar, 2019.
