= Papa Ibra Tall =

Senegalese visual artist (1935-2015)

- Born: 1935; Tivaouane, Thiès Region, Senegal
- Died: 2015 (aged 79–80)
- Education: École nationale supérieure des Beaux-Arts, École Spéciale d'Architecture
- Known for: Tapestry, painting
- Movement: Dakar School (French: École de Dakar)

Papa Ibra Tall (1935–2015) was a Senegalese tapestry weaver, painter, and illustrator. He is known for his role in the Dakar School (French: École de Dakar) art movement, and as an early professor at the École Nationale des Beaux Arts.

== Biography ==
Papa Ibra Tall was born in 1935 in the city of Tivaouane in the Thiès Region of Senegal. His artistic career began with oil painting under the tutelage of amateur French painters in Dakar. In 1955, he studied architecture at the École Spéciale d'Architecture in Paris, where he was exposed to the Négritude movement and provided illustrations for the Présence Africaine. He later attended the École nationale supérieure des Beaux-Arts and pursued instruction in Sèvres. With the assistance of the first Senegalese president Léopold Sédar Senghor, he studied painting, serigraphy, tapestry, mosaics, and comparative pedagogy at Sèvres.

== Career ==
Vin Noir (1964)

Papa Ibra Tall returned to Senegal from France in 1960, where he, Iba N'Diaye, and Pierre Lods founded the École Nationale des Beaux Arts in Dakar. He was instrumental in the École de Dakar art movement, which started at the same time. He headed the Section de Recherches en Arts Plastiques Nègres at the École Nationale des Beaux Arts in Dakar. In his instruction, he sought to encourage the development of an "identifiable" Pan-African idiom, and preferred not to provide formal instruction for fear it would block what he believed to be the natural artistic creativity of African artists.

Tall's tapestries were mainly created in low-warp looms and reflected the style and designs found in his paintings and drawings. At the behest of President Senghor, he founded the Manufacture Sénégalaise des Arts Décoratifs (MSAD) tapestry school in 1965.

Tall was one of several exhibiting African artists in the first Festival Mondial des Arts Nègres in 1966. He and Iba N'Diaye helped to organize the exhibition for FESMAN, Tendances et Confrontations, with N'Diaye taking over preparations in 1965. Tall, N'Diaye and several other artists' work in the show engaged with the theories and artistic elements of the Négritude and Pan-Africanism movements. Tall saw Négritude and its separation from Western artistic standards as a way for African artists to define their own artistic language and standards.

One of his students was Seydou Barry.

== Exhibitions ==
- 8th São Paulo Art Biennial, Brazil, 1965.
- Tendances et Confrontations, Festival Mondial des Arts Nègres, Dakar, 1966.
- 1st Pan-African Festival of Algiers, 1969.
- 1st Salon of Senegalese Visual Artists at the Musée Dynamique, Dakar, 1973.
- Dessins de Papa Ibra Tall, National Gallery of Art, Dakar, 1991.
