= Sergio Borelli =

Italian journalist (1923–2021)

Sergio Borelli (4 May 1923 – 17 September 2021) was an Italian journalist. He started his career in post-WWII Milan, at the socialist newspaper L'Avanti. In 1949 he was awarded a UNESCO Fellowship that sent him to London to learn at the local newspapers and then to the BBC Foreign Dept. From London he wrote for a number of newspapers, among them Paese Sera, L'Avanti, Milano Sera. In 1952 he returned to Milan and - after collaborating with the weeklies L'Illustrazione Italiana and Tempo Illustrato - in 1956 joined the newly founded daily Il Giorno. There he was a foreign correspondent.

== Career ==
=== Interests ===
At that time his major interests were the two great revolutions: Soviet Socialism and China's Communism. He was offered the position of Moscow correspondent for Il Giorno; he was the first Italian correspondent there from an independent newspaper. Back to Italy three years later, he continued working as foreign correspondent and, among other things, covered the Algerian War, the first commercial round-the-world flight, Khrushchev's memorable 1959 trip to the U.S., and the 1965 U.S. invasion of Santo Domingo.

=== Television ===
In 1965, Borelli left the newspapers for television, where he developed documentaries and reportage for the News Department of RAI, the Italian State's TV network. He experimented with different TV formats in collaboration at RAI. In 1966, Borelli made "Il Festival de Dakar", a 50-minute documentary of Premier Festival Mondial des Arts Nègres (FESMAN) or World Festival of Black Arts, in Dakar, 1966.

=== International ===
Labeled as politically unreliable for his critical stances, Borelli was removed from the News Department and given a position at Prix Italia, an international TV competition. There, he connected with peers working in European TV stations who, like him, were exploring new formats. In 1973 at the Prix Italia held in Venice, Sergio and a small group of professionals from public television met with Pierre Schaeffer, of INA Institut National de l'Audiovisuel and Director of the Research Department of ORTF, France and founded CIRCOM - International Cooperative for Research and Action on the Field of Communication. Sergio Borelli was the President of CIRCOM from 1983 to 1989

=== Founder ===
In 1977 invited by Howard Klein of the Rockefeller Foundation, Borelli and others - among them James Day of WNET, Russell Connor of the TV Lab at Thirteen/WNET, Fred Barzyk of WGBH-TV, Nam June Paik and Bill Viola - founded INPUT (International Public Television Screening Conference).

From 1990 on, retired from RAI, he dedicated himself full-time to INPUT. Borelli was the International Program Coordinator, but was better known for his informal role of "agent provocateur". He defended the non-competitive nature of the conference and worked hard to promote diversity. Up to his 87th birthday he conducted workshops with filmmakers in Asia and Africa and followed his two greatest passions: traveling and talking to as many people as possible.

=== Documentary ===
"The House He Built" documentary film of Borelli's life and wunderkammer home in Rome is available at

== Death ==
Borelli died on 17 September 2021, at the age of 98.

== Awards ==
In 1962, Borelli was awarded The Premiolino, the oldest and most prestigious Italian journalism award, for his reporting from Algers. It is made annually to six journalists from print media and television for their career achievements and their contributions to the freedom of the press. Years later, for his work defending public TV, he was named an Honorary Member of the US Congress.
