= Agnam Thiodaye =

Coordinates: 15°37′59″N 13°16′59″W

- Village
- Interactive map of Agnam Thiodaye
- Country: Senegal
- Region: Matam
- Department: Matam

Population (2002)
  - Total: 3,579
- Time zone: UTC+0 (GMT)

Agnam Thiodaye is a village in the Matam department in the north-east of Senegal.

== Geography ==
Agnam Thiodaye is located 2 km from Agnam-Goly.

=== Population ===
At the last census in 2002, Agnam Thiodaye had 3,579 people and 362 households. The population is mainly composed of Fulani Hal Pulaar people and some Wolof people (mostly traders), who come mostly from the religious city of Touba.

== Toponymy ==
The word Agnam comes from the verb aar niaam which means "come and eat". 'This is a common prefix for a large number of villages in the region. The word thiodaye comes from the verbal group tiode ndo which means "go there" or "live there."

== History ==
The first inhabitants of the village lived above the present village, that is to say in Diéri (kadiel mbay toulay) and at this time, there were all kinds of witchcraft, and later worship of the dead. They moved to settle in the bottom of the current village, near the Walo (fonde amadou tall) but at that place there were stinging ants which could cause death. That is when a man passing by told them tiode nd ndo (live in the middle), that is to say between the Diéri (kadiel mbay toulay) and the Walo (fonde amadou tall) and so the word Thiodaye was created.

Noted people from here include artist Amadou Ba.

== Administration ==
The village is part of the rural community of Agnam Civol in the Matam region. Since 2005 the village has had a college of learning and, since 2008, a school.
