= Ndoye Douts =

Senegalese plastic artist (1973–2023)

- Born: Mohamadou Ndoye; 1 May 1973; Sangalkam, Rufisque Department, Senegal
- Died: 9 June 2023 (aged 50)
- Education: National School of Arts in Dakar
- Occupation: Plastic artist

Ndoye Douts, pseudonym of Mohamadou Ndoye, (1 May 1973 – 9 June 2023) was a Senegalese plastic artist. He was part of the third generation of the École de Dakar.

His main inspiration came from the fast-paced environment of cities. In 2001, he created a short animated film, titled Train-Train Medina.

== Works ==
- Caméléon
- Medina Blue
- Rebeuss
- Vue horizontale 1 et 2 (diptyque)
- Ambiances de ville
