= Dynamic Museum =

- Musée Dynamique
- Established: March 31, 1966; 60 years ago
- Location: Dakar, Senegal
- Type: Art museum

The Dynamic Museum (French: Musée Dynamique) is a museum in Dakar, Senegal.

== History ==
The museum was part of a series of cultural projects initiated by President Léopold Sédar Senghor. The museum was inaugurated on March 31, 1966, by Senghor and André Malraux and played an important role in the Dakar Festival of Negro Arts, which ran from April 1 to April 24, 1966. The museum was designed to act as a decolonial celebration of African culture, and it featured artifacts and history from the Iron Age Nok culture all the way up to the modern era. Its first exhibition featured over 600 pieces of African art which were borrowed from 50 museums around the world. The Musée d'Art Moderne de Paris also loaned the Dynamic Museum works from Pablo Picasso, Fernand Léger, and Amedeo Modigliani for an exhibit.

From the 1960s to the 1970s, the museum featured collections of art and culture from the history of Senegal, as well as exhibitions of artists such as Pablo Picasso, Friedensreich Hundertwasser, Pierre Soulages and Marc Chagall. In 1988, the museum was controversially closed and the building repurposed by the Senegalese government as a courthouse. In 1996, Abdou Diouf announced that the museum would be reinaugurated and the courthouse moved, although this never came to fruition. President Macky Sall returned the building to the arts community in 2016, on the 50th anniversary of the Festival of Negro Arts, so that it could act as a museum once again.

== Architecture ==
The outside of the Dynamic Museum recalls Classical architecture, while the interior is more spacious and is designed to offer flexible exhibition layouts.
