= Sea Diallo =

Senegalese artist (1958–2025)

- Born: 26 July 1958; Thiès, French Senegal, French West Africa (now Senegal)
- Died: 2 February 2025 (aged 66); Dakar, Senegal
- Occupation(s): Painter, artist

Sea Diallo (26 July 1958 – 2 February 2025) was a Senegalese artist. He practiced a wide array of arts, including painting, reverse glass painting, ceramics, sculpture, photography, engraving, and poetry.

Alongside Serigne Ndiaye and Anta Germaine Gaye, Diallo was part of the second generation of the Dakar School art movement. He was a resident of the Village des Arts de Dakar.

Diallo died in Dakar on 2 February 2025, at the age of 66.

== Works ==
- Pollution (reverse glass painting, or sous verre)
- Réchauffement des fonds sous-marins (reverse glass painting, or sous verre)
- Attitude - Rêverie (reverse glass painting, or sous verre)
