= Maïmouna Dieye =

Senegalese politician

Minister of Family and Solidarities
- Incumbent
- Assumed office 5 April 2024
- President: Bassirou Diomaye Faye

Mayor of Patte d'Oie
- In office 2022–2024

Personal details
- Education: Institut Pigier, Dakar
- Occupation: Politician

Maïmouna Dieye is a Senegalese politician and activist. She is the current Minister of Family and Solidarities of Senegal, a position she has held since she assumed office on April 5, 2024. She's a prominent member of the PASTEF party, she is the president of the party's national women's movement.
