= Adama Paris =

Senegalese fashion designer

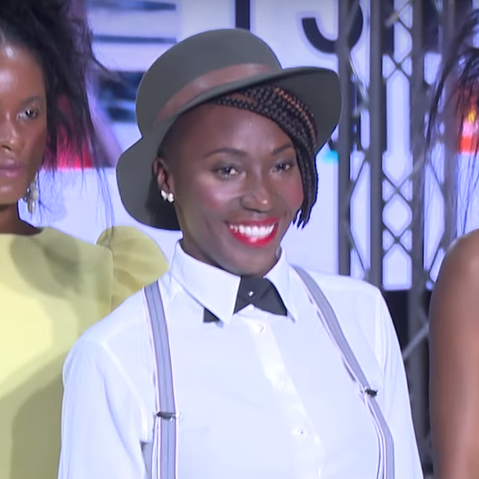
- Adama Paris during Fashion Week Nov 2016
- Born: Adama Amanda Ndiaye; Kinshasa, Zaire
- Occupation: Fashion designer

Adama Amanda Ndiaye is a Senegalese fashion designer. She also goes by the name Adama Paris, which is also the name of the label she owns and operates. Her pieces, which are manufactured in Morocco, can be found internationally, including in New York City, Tokyo, London and Paris. She is credited with starting Black Fashion Week.

== Life ==
Ndiaye was born in Kinshasa, Zaire and of Senegalese descent, then raised in Europe, where her parents were diplomats. She left a banking career in Europe to pursue fashion design in her native country. Africa had a long history of design but struggled for mainstream acceptance, and raising capital for her business was difficult. In order to expand the visibility of African design, Ndiaye created the Dakar Fashion Week exhibition. By 2012, the tenth year of the show, it attracted thirty designers from nine countries in Africa and Asia, with audience members coming from around the world, and had an operating budget of more than CFA 80 million (about US$150,000). She has also organized Black Fashion Week events in Prague, Czech Republic, and Bahia, Brazil.

Her designs are inspired by cities and globalism. In an interview with Vogue Italia, she stated, "Much of my inspiration come from the big cities... My aim was and still is sharing with all modern women one fashion without borders."

Ndiaye has noted that among many African nations, religious objections have made designers unable to practice their profession. She credits the generally tolerant culture of Senegal for providing a supportive environment. She has also spoken out, with other African designers, for increased funding and access to credit from governments in order to foster innovation and job creation in the fashion industry.
