= Daniel Annerose =

CEO and founder of Manobi

- Citizenship: Senegal
- Occupation: Scientist

Daniel Annerose is the CEO and founder of Manobi, a Senegalese business, which gathers data on current prices for locally sold commodities in and around Dakar, and then provides pricing information to farmers and other producers in Senegal via cell phone.

== Background ==
Annerose was born in Dakar. He earned a PhD in Biology from the University of Paris XI, and is a member of the l'Académie des Sciences et Techniques du Sénégal (Senegalese Academy of Sciences and Technology). Annerose trained and worked as a plant scientist for 18 years, specifically on agricultural yields in arid and semi-arid areas and on mathematical models for predicting yields and anticipating food crises.
