= Fatoumata Bâ =

Tech Entrepreneur & VC Investor

- Born: 1986 (age 39–40); Senegal
- Citizenship: Senegalese
- Education: Toulouse Business School (BSc); TBS Education (MSc); Harvard Kennedy School
- Occupations: Tech, Entrepreneur
- Known for: Founder of Janngo Capital
- Awards: Aenne Burda Award

Fatoumata Bâ (born 1986) is a Senegalese tech entrepreneur, and founder of Janngo Capital. She is credited with the expansion of Jumia, and acceleration of education, and SMEs growth through technology in Africa.

== Life and career ==
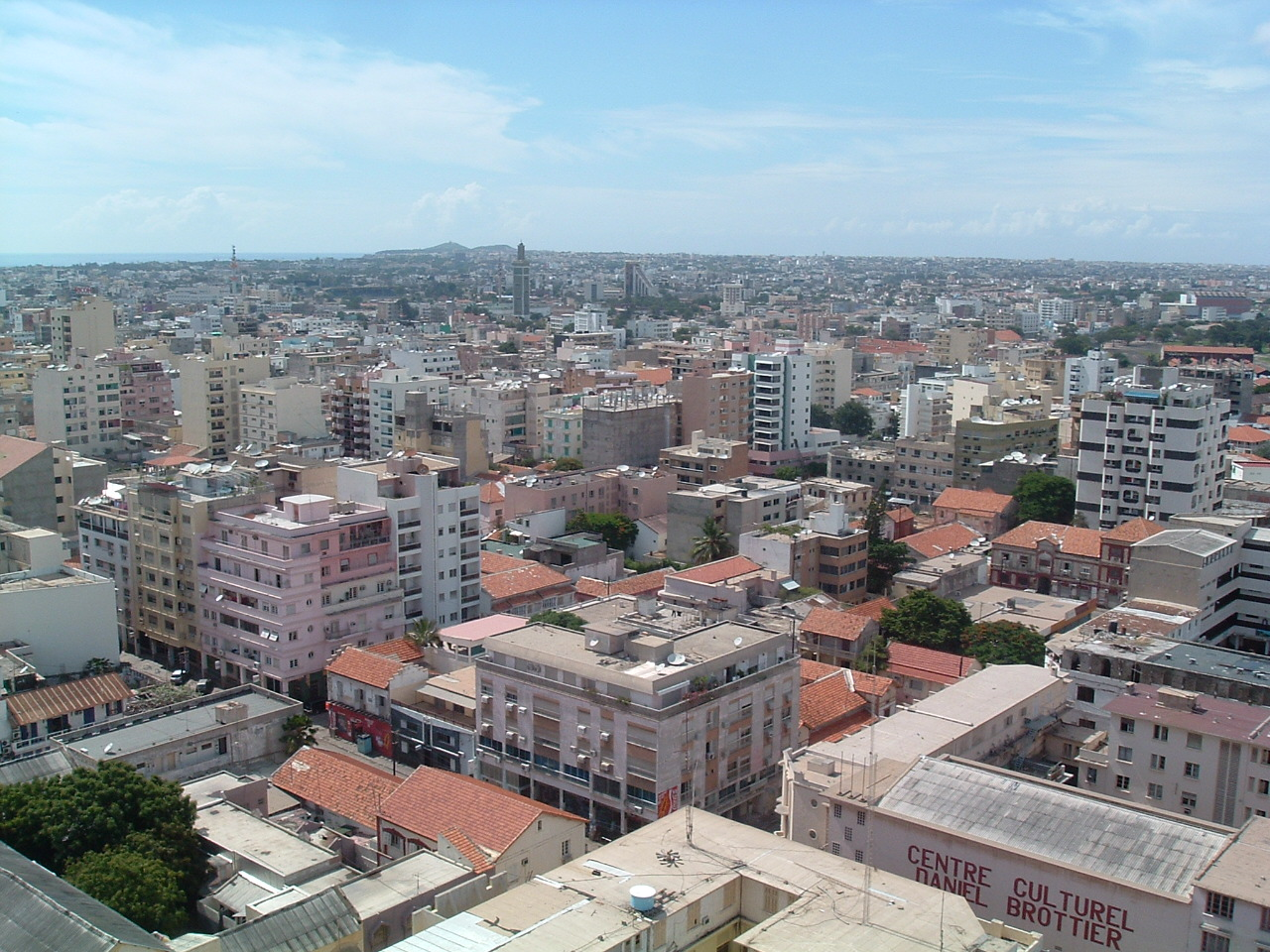
Dakar, Senegal

=== Family and educational background ===
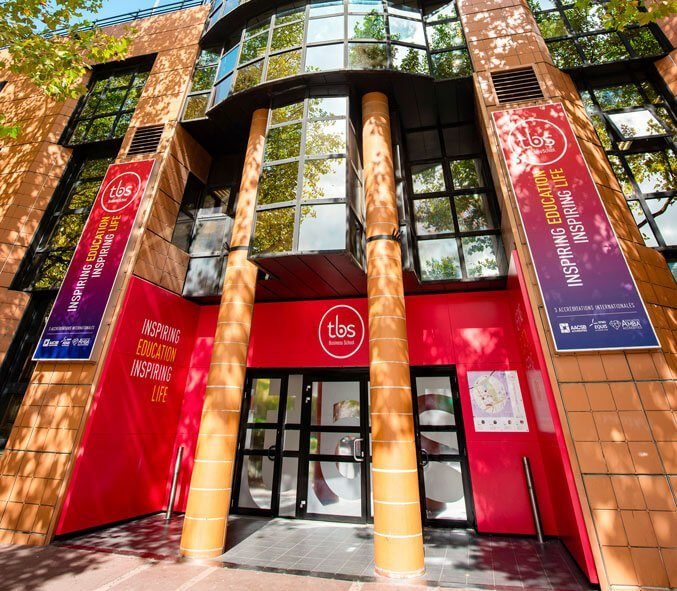
Toulouse Business School

Born in 1986 into a middle-class family in Dakar Senegal, Fatoumata developed an early interest in technology at just nine years old, when she hacked her father’s computer. By the age of 11, she had created her first email address, and at 16, she built her first website. Fatoumata holds a bachelor's degree from Toulouse Business School in Togo, and a masters degree in Management, Strategy, Marketing, and Finance from ESC Toulouse, France. she further attended Harvard Kennedy School, United States, for Executive Education in Global Leadership and Public Policy.

==== Career ====
Fatoumata began her professional career in 2007 as an Accounts Manager and Business Developer for Index Multimedia. In 2008, she joined France Telecom as a Sales Advisor and later advanced to the role of Business Analyst. She continued to build her career at Atos Consulting, where she worked as a Senior Consultant for three years. Returning to Africa, Fatoumata founded Jumia Côte d’Ivoire and served as its CEO from 2013 to 2015. She then became the Managing Director of Jumia Nigeria, where she played a key role in the company’s expansion and success across the continent. She currently serves on the Board of SouthBridge Investment Bank and is a member of the Board and Investment Committee of Creadev Africa. She is also involved with the Council of Women in Africa and the World Economic Forum’s Global Future Council on the New Economic Agenda.

Janngo

Founded in 2018, Janngo Capital is an Ivory Coast-based venture capital firm with a diverse portfolio spanning consumer goods, retail, agribusiness, technology, financial services, and healthcare sectors across Africa. The firm is dedicated to building, growing, and investing in pan-African "tech for good" champions, with its main offices in Abidjan and Paris Janngo Capital is recognized as Africa's largest gender-balanced tech fund. It is backed by a group of investors, including an equal mix of development finance institutions and leading commercial, private investors, such as the European Investment Bank (EIB), the African Development Bank (AfDB), and Proparco.

== Awards and recognition ==
- World Economic Forum 'Young Global Leader'.
- Choiseul 100 Africa 'Economic Leaders of Tomorrow'.
- Forbes Africa '30 under 30'.
- Aenne Burda Award for visionary leadership, optimism, and courage.
- 100 Most Influential African Women 2020 & 2021.
