= Iba N'Diaye =

Senegalese-born French painter and educator

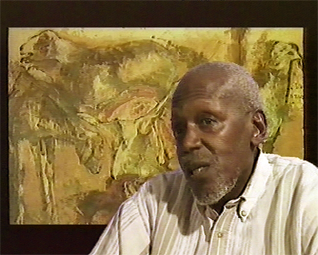
- Iba N'Diaye seated in front of one of the "Tabaski" series, (1995)
- Born: 1928; Saint-Louis, Senegal
- Died: October 5, 2008 (aged 79–80); Paris, France
- Education: École des Beaux-Arts; Académie de la Grande Chaumière
- Occupations: Painting, educator
- Movement: Dakar School

Iba N'Diaye (1928 – October 5, 2008) was a Senegalese-born French painter and educator. Trained in Senegal and France during the colonial period, N'Diaye utilized European modernist fine arts training and medium to depict his views of African realities. He returned to Senegal upon its independence, and became the founding head of École Nationale des Beaux Arts in Dakar. Disenchanted with the prevailing artistic and political climate of mid-1960s Dakar, N'Diaye returned to France in 1967 and exhibited around the globe, returning to his birthplace of Saint-Louis, Senegal, to present his work in Senegal again only in 2000. N'Diaye died at his home in Paris in October, 2008 at the age of 80.

== Early life and training ==
Iba N'Diaye was born in 1928, in Saint Louis, Senegal. His family was religious, his father was Muslim Wolof and his mother was Catholic. As a student he painted posters for cinemas and businesses in his town. When he was 15 years old he began his studies at the Lycée Faidherbe in Saint Louis, Sénégal.

He studied architecture in Senegal, before traveling to France in 1948, where he began studying architecture at the École des Beaux-Arts in Montpellier.

He continued his studied fine arts at the École des Beaux-Arts in Paris in 1949; followed by the Académie de la Grande Chaumière in Paris. As a student he worked under French architect Georges-Henri Pingusson. The sculptor Ossip Zadkine at the Académie de la Grande Chaumière introduced him to traditional African sculpture, and he grew to love painting from Yves Brayer. He remained at the Académie de la Grande Chaumière until 1958.

== Return to Africa ==
When Senegal achieved independence in 1959, he returned at the request of President Léopold Senghor, to found the Department of Plastic Arts at the École Nationale des Beaux Arts in Dakar. There he exhibited his work in 1962 and worked as a teacher until 1966. He taught and inspired a generation of fine artists, including painters such as Mor Faye.

N'Diaye, along with Papa Ibra Tall and Pierre Lods founded the Dakar School (French: École de Dakar), an art movement that allied painting, sculpture and crafts into the cultural movement of Négritude (founded in the 1930s). It was an attempt to assert a distinctively African voice in the arts, free of, if borrowing elements from, the traditions of colonial nations. "Africanité" (Africanness) combined the Negritude of Senghor and the Pan-Africanism of decolonialism. N'Diaye, however, remained committed to teach the fundamentals and techniques of Western art, at times putting him at odds with his fellow teachers and artists. He wrote of the danger of "Africanness" sliding back into a simplistic Noble savage self-parody if rejecting Western forms meant rejecting a rigorous technical background. The pursuit of this "instinctive" Africanness is best exemplified by Papa Ibra Tall, who felt that African artists must "unlearn" western habits, tapping instinctual African creativity. Tall and N'Diaye were the two best-known French-educated Senegalese fine artists of their time. While Tall's vision was to win out in the short term, the 1970s and 80s saw a reappraisal of N'Diaye's positions and an eventual rejection of the more straightforward state-sponsored "Africanité". President Senghor, as a poet one of the founders of Negritude, devoted as much as %25 of the Senegalese budget to the arts and was seen as the patron of artists like the Ecole de Dakar. Misgivings by artists such as N'Diaye (as well as outright opposition by artists such as film-maker/author Ousmane Sembène) fed into a later creative break with Negritude, in the 1970s led by the Laboratoire Agit-Art art community in Dakar. N'Diaye's disenchantment and return to France in 1967 came just a year after the World Festival of Black Arts was founded in Dakar: a triumph of the "Africanité" arts.

N'Diaye died in Paris on October 4, 2008, at the age of 80 of heart failure. The Senegalese Ministry of Culture is coordinating his interment, beside his mother, in the Catholic cemetery of Saint-Louis, Senegal. Upon the artist's death, President of Senegal Abdoulaye Wade called N'Diaye the "Father-founder of Senegalese Modern Art."

== Influences and fights ==
N’Diaye were among these African artists taxed of hybrid, because of the crossbreeding from the western form of art and Senegalese background of his artworks. However, he claimed that the development of African art was intrinsically linked to the colonial legacy, but also through the interaction with the world, as he declared:

“I think everyone is a hybrid, nobody, no matter what the civilization, can say that his originality is simply an originality of place. Originality goes beyond original provenance, thanks to the acquisition from and contact with others. There is therefore, always a mixing, the mixing is a universal part of being human”

Thereby, he opposed himself against the African Primitivism that tend to claim an African art purely African.

=== Religion ===
In addition, the religious influence of Islam - born from a Muslim father- is observable via the series “Tabaski” ( ritual Muslim sacrifice of lamb). Yet, N’diaye is not making directly the critic of Islam; instead tried to paint through the ingeniousness of this animal devoted to suffer for the sins of man, the destructive nature of the human-being, the suffering, the brutality. The painting “La ronde, à qui le tour?” <<Who's Next?>>, illustrates the violence of the human being on nature, more on his alike. In fact, the artist wants to tell to the spectator that everybody, even him can be the lamb, as said Deleuze: “La viande est la zone commune de l’homme et de la bête, leur zone d’indiscernabilité, elle est ce « fait », cet état même où le peintre s’identifie aux objets de son horreur ou de sa compassion” << Meat is the common area of man and beast, their zone of indiscernibility, it is this "fact", this very state where the painter identifies with the objects of his horror or his compassion >>. Hence, the artist's use of color palette that depicts butchery scenes tends to make us aware of violence abuse found in genocide, killings, oppression, as he declared : “Les éléments plastiques que sont la couleur du sang, le sol craquelé des latérites africaines, la ronde sacrificielle me sont apparus comme des traductions possibles de l’oppression d’un peuple sur un autre ou d’un individu sur un autre” <<The plastic elements that are the color of the blood, the cracked soil of African laterites, the sacrificial round appeared to me as possible translations of the oppression of one people on another or of an individual on another>>.

=== Africa and Europe ===
During his peregrinations in Europe's museums and Africa, Iba N’diaye assess the past via the artistic productions that prevailed from Velasquez to Picasso, to some primitive African masks and sculptures. Through the means of sketches and drawings, N’diaye succeed to master the forms and techniques of paintings that he observed and fastidiously analysed. Considering “Head of a Djem Statuette Nigeria” (1976) or “Study of an African Sculpture” (1977), they demonstrate the studious control in N’diaye's drawings, yet remind the analogy between the series of The cry of Edvard Munch and those of N’Diaye; though completely reappropriated in terms of form, details and subject to the negro context of freedom acquiring. The question of racism and injustice is discussed with the painting “Juan de Pareja attacked by Dog” (1986), where the narrative of Juan de Pareja, a slave moors who was granted freedom thanks to his art, is revised in the stolidness of the subject which prefers to not answer to the bestiality, but let his talent speak for himself.

== Exhibition history ==
Working at his Parisian "la Ruche Atelier" and his home in the Dordogne, N'Diaye painted some of his best-known works, a series on the theme of the biblical ritual slaughter of a lamb: the "Tabaski" series, exhibiting them at Sarlat in 1970 and at Amiens in 1974.

N'Diaye exhibited his paintings in New York City (1981), in the Netherlands (1989); in 1990 in Tampere (1990), and at the Museum Paleis Lange Voorhout in The Hague (1996). In 1987 was the subject of a retrospective at the Museum für Völkerkunde in Munich. In 2000, he returned to Saint Louis for his first exhibition in Senegal since 1981. In 1977, he was the subject of a retrospective at the Musée Dynamique, while in 1981, his work was presented at the Centre culturel Gaston Berger de Dakar. Since that time major showing of his work was staged at the Senegalese Galerie nationale (2003) and the Musée de la Place du Souvenir (2008), both in the Senegalese capitol.

In 2025 the Metropolitan Museum inaugurated its Michael C. Rockefeller Wing’s in-focus gallery with Iba Ndiaye: Between Latitude and Longitude.

== Work ==
Influenced equally by western Modernism and African tradition, one reviewer described him as "a Senegalese painter whose insistence that African artists can be whatever they want to be". N’Diaye's works do not evolve in a chronological manner, rather in thematic series in which each theme is developed throughout time, allowing the pencil of the artist to be fully expressed. Critics usually categorize his works in these themes: the Jazz, Tabaski, The Cries, Landscapes and Portraits. His study of African sculpture has shown in his subjects, but treated in colors and mood reminiscent of abstract expressionism. Equally, Jazz musicians, painted in movement and swirls of color, have been a recurring theme in his work: his "Hommage à Bessie Smith" is perhaps the best known.

== Notable work ==
- Tabaski la Ronde à qui le Tour (1970)
- Sahel (1977)
- The Cry / Head of a Djem Statuette Nigeria (1976)
- Study of an African Sculpture (1977)
- The Painter and his Model (1979)
- Study of a Wé Mask (1982)
- Jazz in Manhattan (1984)
- Big Band (1986)
- Juan de Pareja Attacked by Dogs (1986)
- The Cry (1987)
- Hommage à Bessie Smith (1987)
- Trombone (1995)
- Trio (1999)
