= Dakar School =

Art movement in Senegal, 1960 to 1974

Dakar School École de Dakar
- Years active: September 1960–1974
- Location: Senegal
- Major figures: Léopold Sédar Senghor, Iba N'Diaye, Papa Ibra Tall, Pierre Lods,
- Influences: Government of Senegal, Négritude

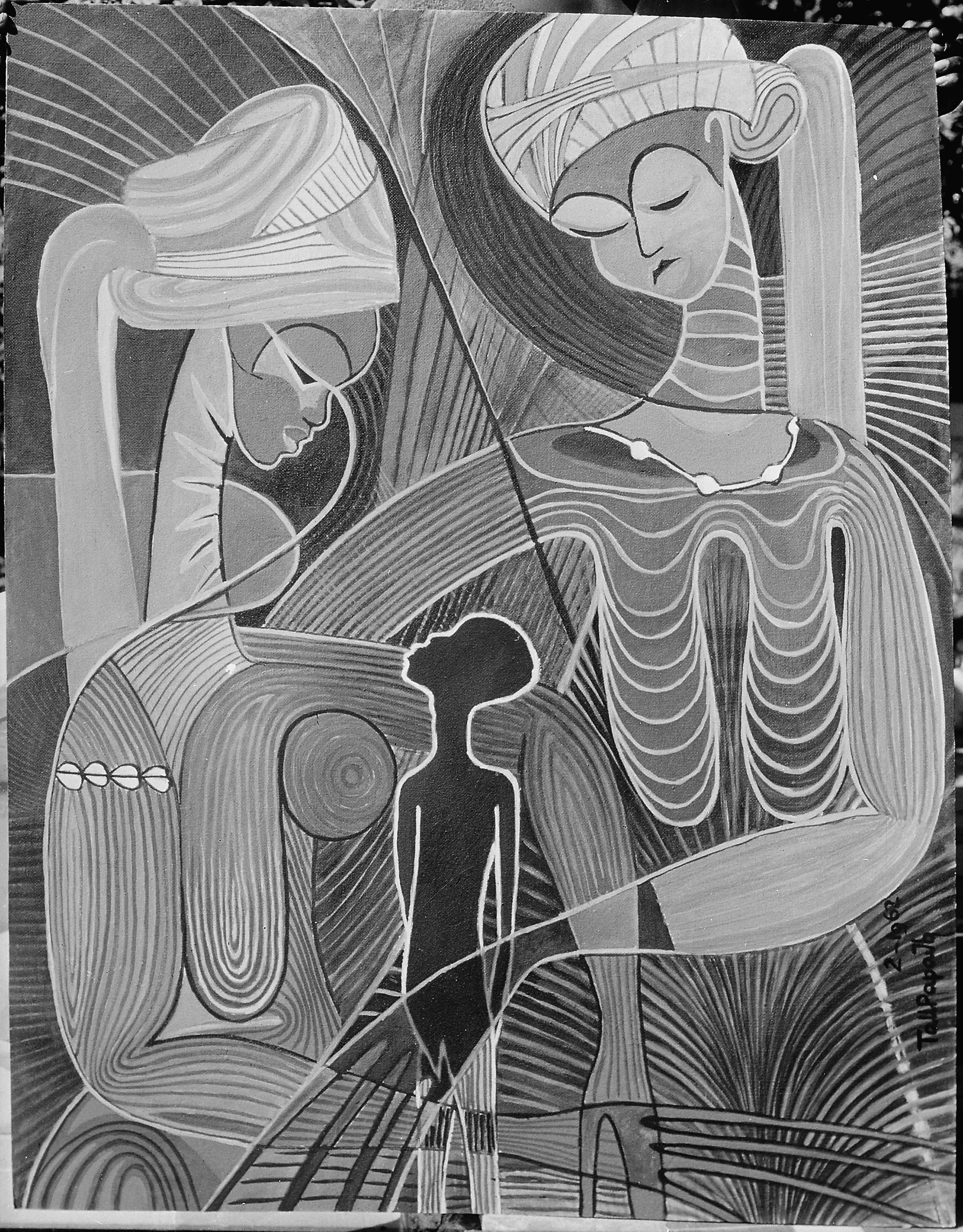
"La Foret aux Souvenirs" (1962) by Papa Ibra Tall

The Dakar School (French: École de Dakar, lit. 'School of Dakar') is an art movement in Senegal at the dawn of independence, between 1960 and 1974. It was supported by the first Senegalese President Léopold Sédar Senghor and was associated with his cultural policies informed by the larger Négritude movement from the 1930s, which emphasized Black cultural identity and heritage within a modernist framework.

Founding figures commonly associated with this movement included Papa Ibra Tall, Iba N'Diaye, and Pierre Lods.

== History ==
Senegalese President Léopold Sédar Senghor was the first art critic of French-speaking Black Africa, which started with his first publication on the matter in 1956. In his early years of office starting in 1960, Senghor's cultural policy emphasized the development of a national identity through the arts and aimed to establish Senegal as a hub for modern African artistic production. The cultural policies involved the creation of museums, art schools, and festivals, such as the Grand National Theater of Dakar (French: Grand Théâtre National de Dakar), the National Tapestry Manufacturers in Thiès (French: Manufacture Nationale de Tapisserie de Thiès), and the École Nationale des Beaux Arts (it merged in 1995 and now National School of Arts, Senegal) in Dakar.

Under the paternalism of Senghor, the Dakar School was formed in September 1960 and its approach aimed to form a globalized contemporary art in Senegal. It utilized the ideas from Senghor's Black nationalist movement, Négritude (founded in the 1930s), and strived to demonstrate that the Black Africans were capable of creating beauty honed within African models. Though based on the model of Western contemporary art the focus was on African expression. Within this framework, the Dakar School developed and artists frequently engaged with state cultural programs, which subsequently influenced both the production and dissemination of their work. Scholars have noted that Senghor's cultural policies helped establish a close relationship between artistic practice and state institutions, with visual arts development occurring within government-supported structures.

The style that later became known as the Dakar School gained significant visibility during the World Festival of Black Arts (French: Festival Mondial des Arts Negres), particularly through the exhibition Tendances et Confrontations curated by Iba N'Diaye. At the World Festival of Black Arts (also known as FESMAN or FMAN), which included participants from more than forty countries and attracted over 25,000 visitors, the festival and its preceding Colloquium on Negro Art provided an internation platform for Léopold Sédar Senghor to present ideas associated with Négritude and his vision of modern African cultural production. The event also helped situate the Dakar School within wider transatlantic Black intellectual and artistic networks, including connections to the Harlem Renaissance and Francophonie Négritude writers such as Aimé Césaire and Alioune Diop.

The National Tapestry Manufacturers in Thiès tapestry weaving facility in the city of Thiès was founded in 1966 by Papa Ibra Tall. National Tapestry Manufacturers in Thiès was a government sponsored and supported by Senghor, and many of the Dakar School artists were involved with their work.

== Style ==
Artists including Iba N'diaye, Papa Ibra Tall, Amadou Ba, Amadou Dede, and Ibou Diouf explore a two-dimensional visual approach that combined African aesthetic traditions with elements of Western avant-garde art, especially abstraction and bold graphic forms. The movement favored warm colors, figurative and abstract representations with references to African aesthetics and mythologies.

== List of associated artists ==
- Amadou Ba (born 1945)
- Seydou Barry (1943–2007)
- Boubacar Coulibaly (1944–1984)
- Amadou Dédé (born 1955)
- Alpha Walid Diallo (1927–2000)
- Sea Diallo (1958–2025)
- Ansoumana Diedhiou (born 1949)
- Bacary Diémé (born 1947; also known as Bacary Diame)
- Bocar Pathé Diong (1946–1989)
- M'Baye Diop (1951–2013)
- Daouda Diouck (born 1951)
- Ibou Diouf (born 1953; also known as Ibrahima Diouf)
- Théodore Diouf (born 1949)
- Mor Faye (1947–1985)
- Ousmane Faye (1940–2001)
- Boubacar Goudialy (born 1946)
- Khalifa Gueye (born 1945; also known as Serigne M'Baye Gueye)
- Souleymane Keita (1947–2014)
- Pierre Lods (1921–1988; or Pierre Jacques Andrés Lods)
- Ousseynou Ly (born 1943)
- Mohamadou M'baye (born 1945)
- El Hadj M'Boup (born 1950)
- Abdoulaye Ndiaye (born 1936)
- Djibril N'Diaye (born 1945)
- Iba N'Diaye (1928–2008)
- Abdoulaye Ndoye (born 1951)
- Maodo Niang (1949–2017)
- Moussa Samb
- Amadou Seck (born 1950)
- Diatta Seck (1953–2015)
- Philippe Sène (born 1949)
- Younousse Sèye (born 1940)
- Amadou Sow (1951–2015)
- Papa Ibra Tall (1935–2015)
- Chérif Thiam (born 1951)
- Amadou Wade Sarr (born 1950)

== See also ==
- List of art movements
- List of Senegalese artists
- Dakar Biennale
- World Festival of Black Arts
