= Viyé Diba =

Senegalese

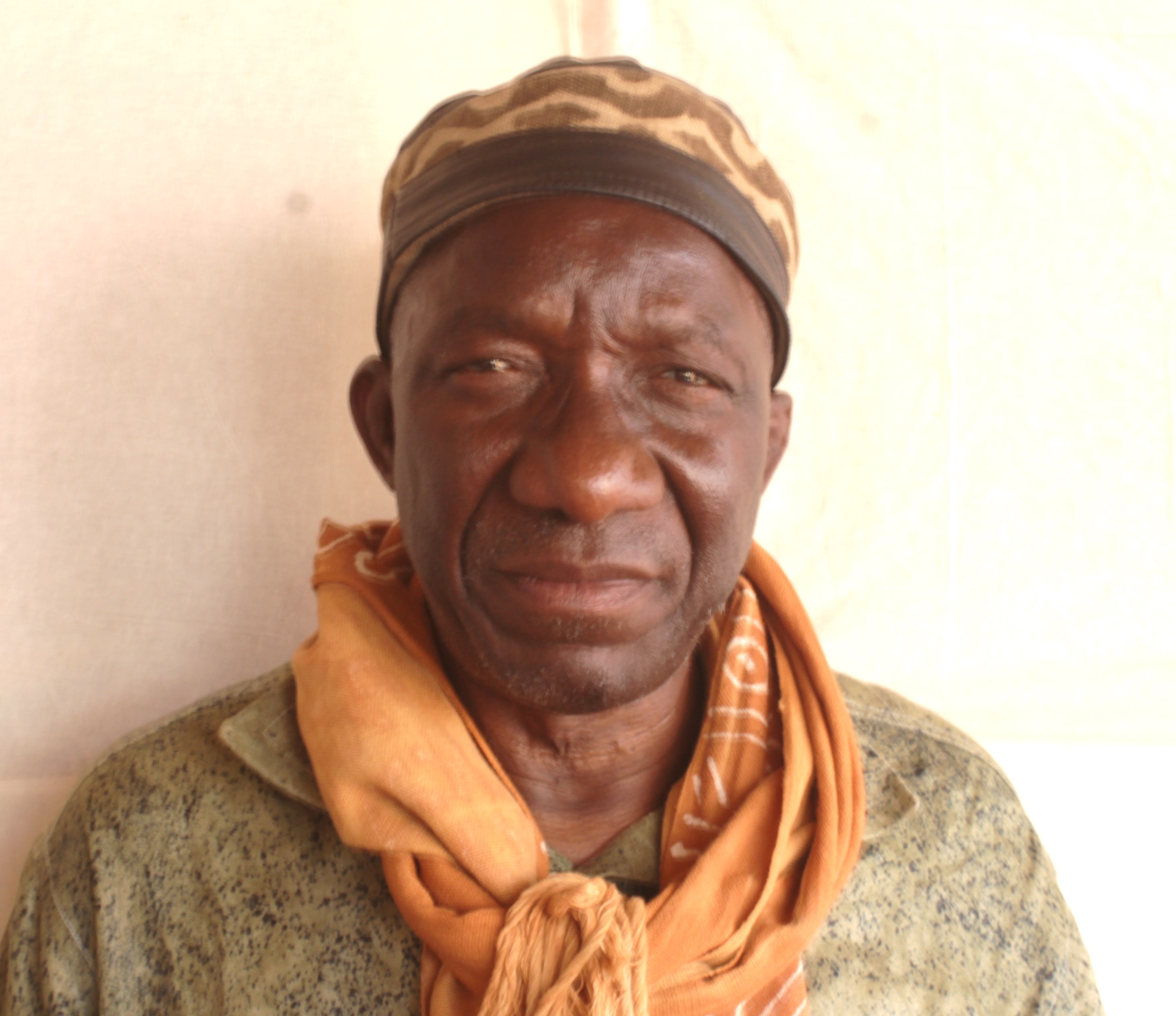
- Born: 1954 (age 71–72); Senegal
- Education: Undergraduate degree in Fine Arts, Ecole Nationale des Beaux-arts, Dakar, Senegal; PhD in Urban Geography, University of Nice Sophia Antipolis, Nice, France
- Occupations: Artist, professor of art education
- Employer(s): Ecole Normale Supérieure d’Education Artistique (ENSEA), Dakar, Senegal

Viyé Diba (born 1954) is a Senegalese mixed-media, installation, and performance artist. He is known for using found, local, raw, and recycled materials in his work, reflecting his interest in environmental themes. Diba's work has been included in several international exhibitions, including Dak’Art, Johannesburg Biennale, and Biennale d’Abidjan, and was featured in a solo exhibition at the National Gallery in Dakar, Senegal. His work can be seen at the North Carolina Museum of Art, Brooklyn Museum, and the National Museum of African Art in Washington, D.C.

== Education ==
Diba received a baccalaureate degree in fine arts at the National School of Fine Arts in Dakar, Senegal in 1979, followed by an additional four-year degree in arts education at Senegal's National School of Art Education, also in Dakar. Diba also received a PhD in Urban Geography from the University of Nice in Nice, France, where his dissertation compared the impact of human activity on the natural environments of Dakar and Nice.

== Career ==
Diba's career as a working artist began in the 1980s. While his earliest works were figurative, Diba's later works take a conceptual approach to interpreting the visual forms of "traditional" African art and exploring the materiality of urban spaces. In 1998, he was awarded the Grand Prize at the Dak'Art Biennial in 1998 for Echappement, a mixed-media work on canvas. Diba has served as a professor of visual arts at Senegal's National School of Fine Arts since 1986.
