= Henri Sagna =

Senegalese sculptor (born 1973)

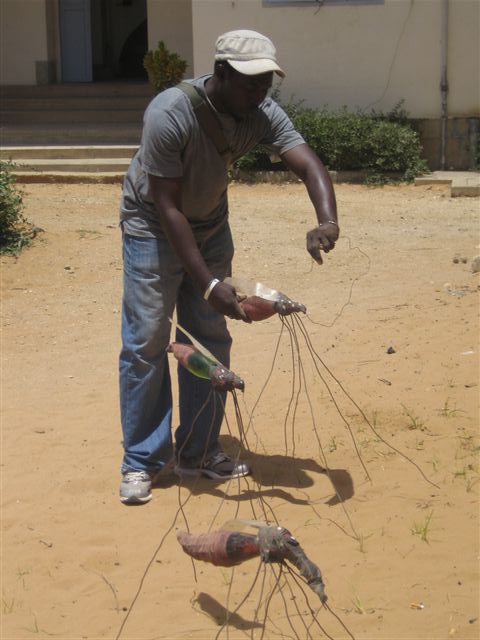
- Henri Sagna at Dakar, May 2008
- Born: 17 June 1973 (age 53); Dakar Senegal
- Education: Ecole nationale des Arts in Dakar
- Known for: Sculpture

Henri Sagna (born 1973 in Dakar) is a Senegalese sculptor.

== Biography ==
Henri Sagna lives and works in Senegal. After his studies at the École nationale des arts du Sénégal in Dakar in 2005, he received the first prize at the sixth National Salon des artistes plasticiens sénégalais. Sagna is known as artist sculptor-recycler. His artworks are formed by assembling collected materials in a variety of ways. The artist leads a series of workshops and ateliers in France and Senegal, which have as their central theme the concepts of recovery and recycling of materials.

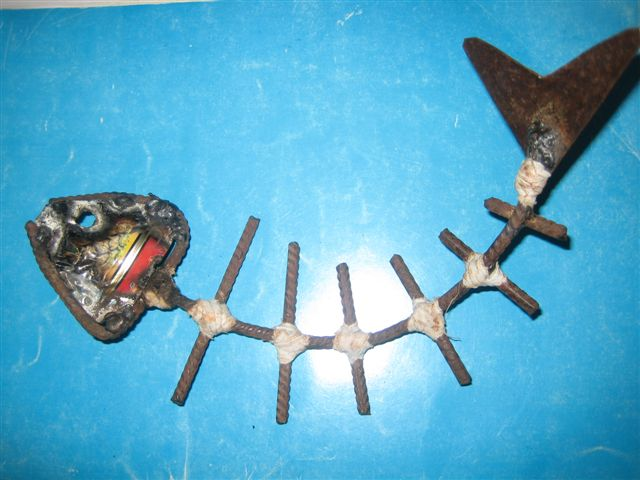
Fish of Henri Sagna

== Works ==
Sagna's work is based on respect for and knowledge of the environment, and to raise awareness of important issues among the general public and residents of townships. A large part of his plastic work is focused on the species of mosquito which transmit malaria.

His artworks represent an interesting method of raising awareness in Europe, and especially in France, of malaria and the damage it causes in Africa. The main objective of the Senegalese sculptor is to teach new generations to cultivate their artistic talents and to continue to care for the natural environment.

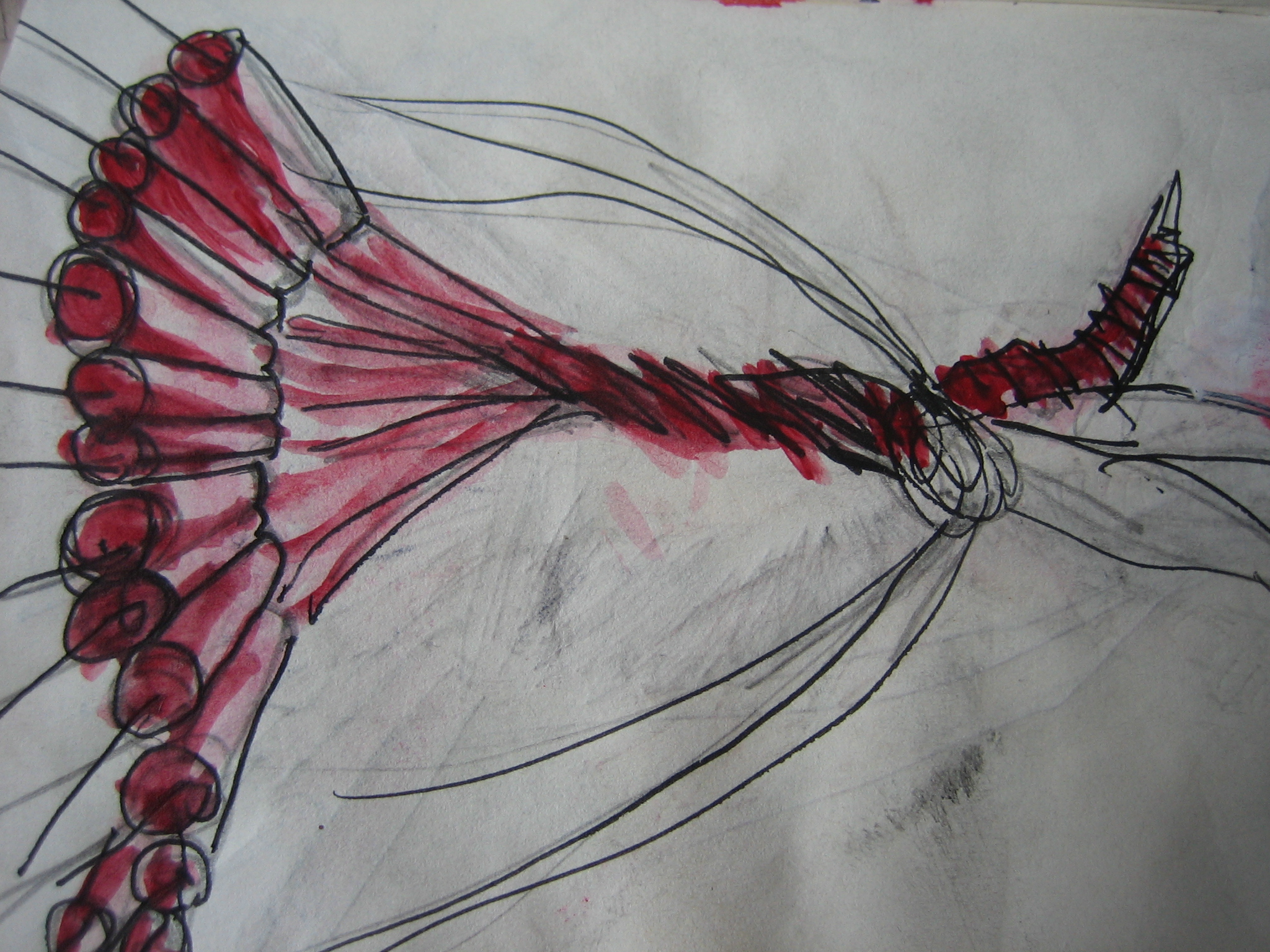
Henri Sagna's mosquito

Amongst the ten contemporary artists of Senegal at the Dapper Museum in Paris in 2006, focusing on the creativity of a generation of Senegalese artists, Sagna set up an entire display of Mosquitoes and insect screens. The insects were made with enormous paws from galvanized steel wire, bottles of soda and celluloid for the wings.
