= Joëlle le Bussy =

French sculptor

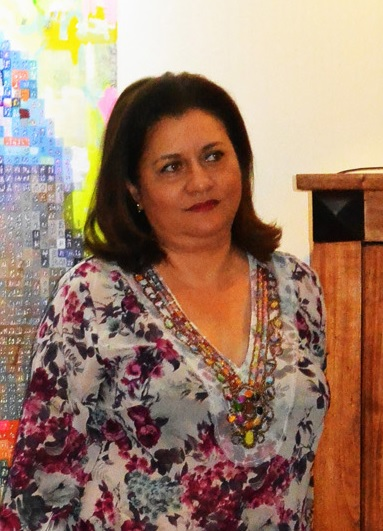
- Born: 1 February 1958 (age 68); Mont-de-Marsan, France
- Known for: Gallerist, sculptor, promotor of African artisans and crafts

Joëlle le Bussy is a French sculptor, art dealer, arts organizer, and art curator based in Dakar, Senegal, where she founded Galerie Arte in 1996.

== Biography ==
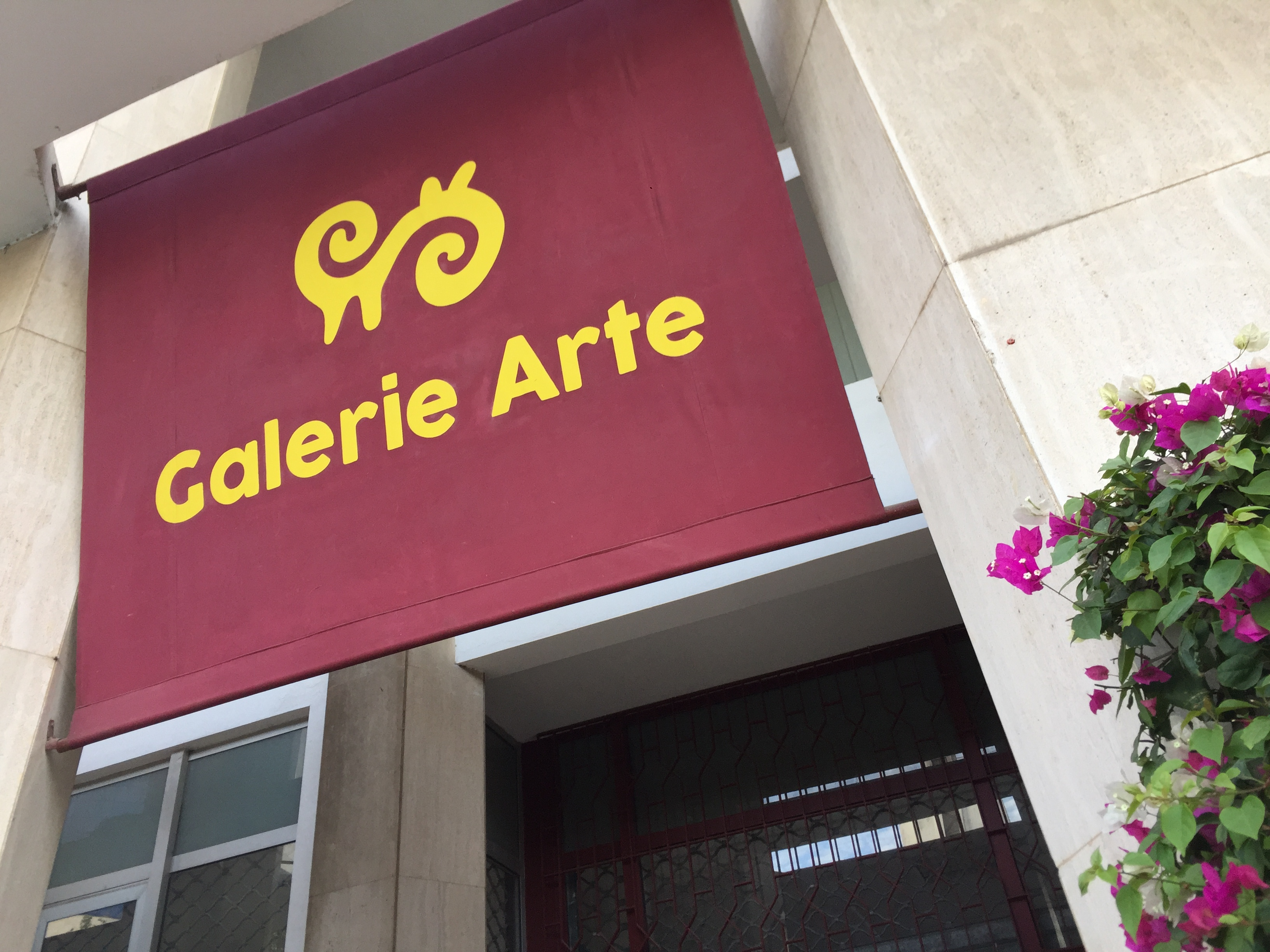
Entrance to the Galerie Arte in Dakar

Of Belgian-Congolese origin, Joëlle le Bussy was born 1 February 1958, in Mont-de-Marsan, France. She founded Galerie Arte in 1996 in the Plateau district of Dakar. Since 2009, the gallery has had a branch in Saint-Louis du Senegal, a city classified as a World Heritage Site. She is also President of the Association for the Promotion of Visual Arts (PAVA) in Africa. In 2009, she was appointed President of Arts and Letters by Amadou Diaw, Secretary General of Saint-Louis, 350. She has since founded the contemporary art festival, Le Fleuve en Couleurs, and through this vehicle, the city of Saint-Louis has become the kick-off point for the Dakar Biennale. The Fleuve en Couleurs is an event organized annually.

Joëlle le Bussy's gallery offers furniture and precious wood objects from the African continent, which she designs and commissions in her Dakar workshops from experienced Casamance craftsmen. The gallery also exhibits many African artists (painters or sculptors) and promotes handicrafts, jewelry and fabrics from West Africa.

== Career ==
=== Exhibition curator ===
- 2000–2005: member of the scientific council of the Dakar Biennale des Arts
- 2005–2007: The Viaduc des Arts, Paris, France .
- 2008–2009: exhibition at the Grand Chancellery of the Légion d’Honneur, Paris, France
- 2005: La Fabrique de la Gare, Bonnieux, France
- 2009: La Petite Tulière, Grignan, France

=== Arts Organization Work in Saint-Louis ===
- 2009–2010: President of Arts and Letters of Saint-Louis 350 (given during the celebration of the city's 350th anniversary)
- 2010–2012: founder of the visual arts event, Le Fleuve en Couleurs
- 2010–2012: organization of the Biennale des Arts Off in Dakar
- 2010: curator of the Carte blanche exhibition at the Galerie Arte, at the Institut français
- 2012: organizer of the Jam-Salam exhibition with residences of Moroccan and Senegalese artists

=== Expertise in Craftsmanship ===
- 2002–2007: member of the selection jury at the SIAO (International Handicrafts Fair of Ouagadougou, Burkina-Faso)
- 2009–2011: president of the jury for the Unesco Award of Excellence, Bamako, Mali
- 2012: member of the selection jury at the SIAO

=== Designer ===
- 1998: founded design studio and cabinet-making workshop in Dakar, Senegal
- 2005: exhibition at Salon Cocoon, Brussels, Belgium
- 2006: workshop of international designers in the workshops of Joëlle le Bussy, Biennale des Arts de Dakar, Senegal
- 2008–2009: exhibition at the New York Gift Fair, New York City, United States
- 2009–2010: exhibition at ICFF, New York, United States
- 2011: exhibition at Maison et Objets fair, Paris, France
- 2008: design prize at the Dakar Biennale of Contemporary African Art

=== Design teacher ===
Joëlle le Bussy has been teaching introductory design courses since 2012 at Gaston Berger University in Saint-Louis, Senegal.
