= École Nationale des Beaux Arts (Senegal) =

Art school in Dakar (1958–1995)

Coordinates: 14.7267°N 17.4710°W

- Former names: Masion des Arts du Mali (1958–1961), École des Arts du Sénégal (EAS; 1961–1971), Institut National des Arts du Sénégal (INAS; 1971–1977), École Nationale des Beaux Arts (ENBA; 1977–1995)
- Successor: National School of Arts of Senegal (in 1995)
- Type: Public
- Active: 1958–1995
- Location: Dakar, Senegal (formerly Mali Federation)

École Nationale des Beaux Arts (ENBA; English: National School of Fine Arts) was a public art school, active from 1958 until 1995 in Dakar, Senegal (formerly known as the Mali Federation). In 1995, this school was merged to form the National School of Arts of Senegal. It was formerly known by the names Masion des Arts du Mali from 1958 to 1961; the École des Arts du Sénégal (EAS) from 1961 to 1971; the Institut National des Arts du Sénégal (INAS) from 1971 to 1977; and finally the École Nationale des Beaux Arts (ENBA) from 1977 until its close.

The earliest instructors at the school were Iba N'Diaye, and Papa Ibra Tall. Many students and teachers from the school were part of the Dakar School art movement in the 1960s and 1970s.
