= World Festival of Black Arts =

Culture and arts festival

World Festival of Black Arts Festival Mondial des Arts Nègres (FESMAN)
- World Festival of Black Arts logo
- Genre: Pan-African
- Locations: Dakar, Senegal; Lagos, Nigeria; Stone Town, Zanzibar; Arusha, Tanzania; Kisumu, Kenya; Accra, Ghana
- Years active: 1966, 1977, 2009/2010, 2022, 2023, 2024, 2025
- Organiser: 1966: Leopold Senghor, 1977: Olusegun Obasanjo, 2010: Abdoulaye Wade, 2022: Abioye Yinka; 2023: Abioye Yinka; 2024: Abioye Yinka; 2025: Abioye Yinka

The World Festival of Black Arts (French: Festival Mondial des Arts Nègres), also known as FESMAN or FMAN, has been a series of month-long culture and arts festivals taking place in various parts of Africa. The festival features participants of cultural expression – arts, literature, music, cinema – from around the African Diaspora.

== First World Festival of Negro Arts – Dakar, 1966 ==
The festivals were planned as Pan-African celebrations and ranged in content from debate to performance — particularly dance and theatre. The filmmaker William Greaves made a 40-minute documentary of the event entitled The First World Festival of Negro Arts (1968). Italian journalist Sergio Borelli produced Il Festival de Dakar (1966) a 50-minute documentary for RAI. Senegalese director Paulin Soumanou Vieyra also produced the documentary Le Sénégal au festival national des arts nègres (1966). Directors from the USSR, Irina Venzher and Leonid Makhnach, produced the Russian-language documentary Ритми Африки (Ritmi Afriki) about the festival.

=== Summary ===
The First World Festival of Black Arts (French: Premier Festival Mondial des Arts Noirs) or World Festival of Negro Arts (French: Festival mondial des arts nègres) was held in Dakar, Senegal, 1–24 April 1966, hosted by former President Leopold Segar Senghor, and supported by the United Nations Educational, Scientific, and Cultural Organization (UNESCO), along with the French government. The festival involved around 2,500 participants from 30 independent African countries and other nations with diasporic communities, such as the US, Brazil, The Caribbean, France, and the United Kingdom. It featured black literature, music, theater, visual arts, film, and dance. It was the first state-sponsored festival to showcase the work of African and African diasporic artists, musicians, and writers to a global audience. Under President Leopold Senghor, the festival was intended to place culture at the forefront of African diasporic renaissance. The main goals of the jubilee were to (1) advance international and interracial understandings, (2) tie the African homeland to external diasporic members, (3) promote the philosophy of Negritude, and (4) allow Negro artists to meet and showcase talents to members/outlets of the international art world.

In preparation for the event, Dakar underwent major reconstruction via internal funding and contributions from participating nations. Dakar built new roads, an airport terminal, and two new venues – the Theatre National Daniel Sorano and the Musée Dynamique – for incoming participants and visitors. Dakar repurposed existing buildings such as the Palace de Justice (law courts), the Cathedral, Dakar Town Hall, and various beachfronts to accommodate the wave of performances that month.

=== Proceedings ===
The festival kicked off with an eight-day colloquium (co-organized by UNESCO) that organized philosophical and theoretical presentations on the function/importance of Negro Arts. Held in the National Assembly Building [Povey, 1966, p. 5]. The opening presentation was given by President Senghor's speech "The Defense and Illustration of Negritude" while other participants provided material for discussion such as Langston Hughes' "Black Writers in a Troubled World". For the rest of the month, festival attendees explored the city by going to various exhibitions in various venues.The Cinema Palace held screenings of submitted films and documentaries, the newly built Musée Dynamique showcased national art exhibits, and the Theatre National Daniel Sorano staged dances, plays, and jazz gigs. International judges also awarded festival prizes in the Daniel Sorano Theater [Povey, 1966, p. 6]. Participants such as poet Tchicaya U Tam'si [France] and playwright Wole Soyinka [Nigeria] left with awards in their respective categories.

=== US participation ===
A North American committee organized US participation in the festival. This delegation was led by H. Alwynn Innes-Brown (president) and John A. Davis (vice president) from the American Society of African Culture. Helping to facilitate US involvement were the US Senegal ambassadors, musician Mercer Cook, and French Literature scholar Ousmane Diop Socé. The US State Department funded the committee and the chosen participants, providing $150,000 in funding, and appointed then-President Lyndon B. Johnson and his wife as honorary members. Key US participants include Ralph Bunche, Alvin Ailey, Marian Anderson, Fred O'Neal, Leontyne Price, Sidney Poitier, Hale Woodruff, Ossie Davis, Duke Ellington, Langston Hughes, Margaret Danner, Rosa Guy, Katherine Dunham, Arthur Mitchell, and William Warfield.

=== Festival critiques ===
While the festival was considered a success – with 50,000 people in attendance total – there was criticism from prominent black scholars and participants before and after the event. The lack of discourse and illustration of the current political struggles and African Liberation was a main source of disparagement. The event avoided deliberation on anti-colonialism and anti-imperialism, highlighting ideas of culture over politics and economy. The festival was also condemned for its selection of participants as mainly nation-states were allowed to contribute, and delegations had to receive approval before submitting representatives. Black scholars such as Afro-Brazilian writer Abdias do Nascimento were denied entry due to not being official members of approved delegations. Moreover, contemporary musicians and radical Black scholars from America – such as James Brown – were not allowed to join as US Representatives. American editor, educator, critic, and author Hoyt Fuller also pointed out the heavy government influence that hung over the event from the US State Department, CIA, and French government.

Congolese stamps for the Festival mondial des arts nègres, 1966
of 90, 30 and 85 Congolese francs
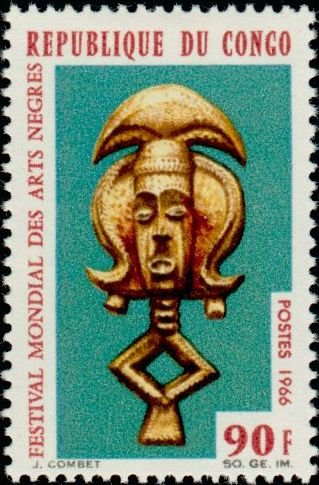
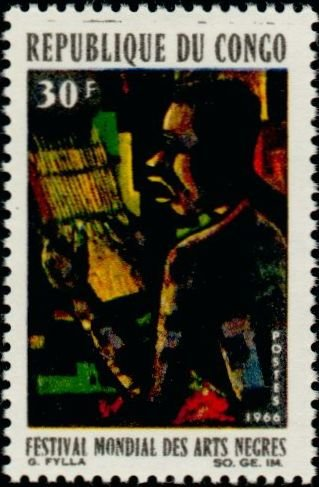
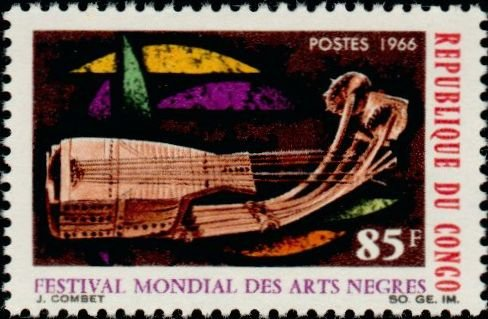

== Continuing festivals ==
=== Algiers, 1969 ===
This sequence also included Festival panafricain d'Alger 1969.

=== Lagos, 1977 ===
In 1977, from 15 January to 12 February, the Second World Festival of Black Arts or Black and African Festival of Arts and Culture — known as FESTAC '77 — took place in Lagos, Nigeria, under the patronage of President Olusegun Obasanjo. Attended by more than 17,000 participants from more than 50 countries, it was the largest cultural event ever held on the African continent. Among artists who took part were Stevie Wonder, Ted Joans, the Sun Ra Arkestra, and Donald Byrd from the US, Tabu Ley and Franco from the Congo, Gilberto Gil from Brazil, Bembeya Jazz National from Guinea, and Louis Moholo, Dudu Pukwana, and Miriam Makeba from South Africa.

=== Dakar, 2010 ===
Senegalese President Abdoulaye Wade initiated the Third World Festival of Black Arts from 10–31 December 2010, with the theme of African Renaissance. President Wade said in his 2009 address at the UN: "I call all Africans, all the sons and daughters of the Diaspora, all my fellow citizens, all the partners that are ready to walk by our side, all States, all international organizations, foundations, firms, etc. for a shining success for this Festival, and the rise of a new Africa." The 2010 festival was curated by Kwame Kwei-Armah, and participants at the opening ceremony included Youssou N'Dour, Baaba Maal, Angélique Kidjo, Toumani Diabaté, Wyclef Jean, Euzhan Palcy, Carlinhos Brown and the Mahotella Queens. As well as music and cinema, the festival featured art exhibitions, theatre and dance performances, fashion shows, photography and other events, with the participation of artists and intellectuals from dozens of African and African diaspora countries, including the US, Brazil, Haiti, France and Cuba.

=== Zanzibar, 2022 ===
Twelve years later, Hotel Verde in Zanzibar hosted Festac, with high-profile names including H.E. Chief Olusegun Obasanjo, Professor Wole Soyinka, H.E. Dr Hussein Ali Mwinyi, and Dr Abdulrazak Gurnah.

=== Arusha, 2023 ===
Under Engr. Yinka Abioye, FESTAC AFRICA 2023 was held in the tourist city of Arusha, Tanzania, with the theme: Experience Africa in Seven Days.

This rendition of the festival opened on Sunday night (21 May 2023) by former Black Panther Party member Charlotte Hill O'Neal with a benediction ceremony and the hoisting of African flags. The official opening (on Monday, 22 May 2023) featured a keynote address from one of Africa's leading thought leaders Prof. P. L. O. Lumumba, who encouraged and commended the work done by Engr. Abioye Yinka.

In various interviews with global media houses, Prof. Lumumba stressed the importance of FESTAC Renaissance to Africa.

The week's activities were followed by performances from the legendary East African band, Les Wanyika, Lord Eyez, Jamapara, and many more, with a three-day conference addressing climate change, women in business, cultural diplomacy, among other topics.

=== Kisumu, 2024 ===
The 2024 edition, otherwise known as the Fifth World Black and African Festival of Arts and Culture, took place in Kisumu, Kenya, between 26 August and 1 September. Held at the Jomo Kenyatta International Stadium in Mamboleo, the event brought together dignitaries from all parts of the world, with the late former Kenyan Prime Minister Raila Odinga and General Olusegun Obasanjo presiding over the opening ceremony. Prof. Peter Anyang' Nyong'o – Governor of the host city – alongside Dr. Farzam Kamalabadi, Dr. Kristina Kenyatta Pratt, Prof. Julia Ojiambo, James Orengo, Gladys Wanga and a host of others were also in-attendance.

In his address to attendees, Gen. Olusegun Obasanjo acknowledged the importance of the renaissance of the festival, while Raila Odinga, who at the time was vying for the African Union Commission Chairperson position rallied African governments to deconstruct beaureacratic travel requirements among Africans.

Considered the most successful edition since rebirth, the week-long event featured a wide array of activities and impact programs, including health screenings, a 5 km walk aimed at creating awareness on Gender-Based Violence and a Dinner in the Dark experience which is perhaps the newest concept adopted under Yinka Abioyes model. Aimed at creating awareness on the challenges of visual impaiement, it took place at the Grand Royal Swiss Hotel and was organised in partnership with the Kenya Society for The Blind.

Cultural performances across the week featured a smogasbord of artists, including Suzanna Owiyo, Les Wanyika band, Culturel Kipfumu from Congo D.R.C, Bamasaba Dancers from Uganda, Burundi Drummers, Wahenga Band from Kenya and others.

On the sidelines of all activities was the business expo centre, where businesses and art crafters exhibited their products and services.

=== Accra, 2025 ===
After FESTAC '24, a number of southern and western African countries bade to host the 6th edition of the festival. By April 2025, Accra-Ghana was declared host city for the next edition. Held between 21 and 27 September, it symbolically coincided with U.N Tourism week. The prelude, held at the Labadi Beach Hotel, was a celebration of the legacy of Ghana's first president Dr. Kwame Nkrumah, in commemoration of the 116th anniversary of his birth. The gala, themed Kente and Calabash was attended by the C.E.O of Ghana Tourism Authority Mrs. Maame Efua Houadjeto, Ambassadors Dayo Adeoye, Thando Dalamba and Kufa E. Chioza of Nigeria, South Africa and Zimbabwe respectively to Ghana, alongside a host of other dignitaries from other parts of Africa, the Caribbean, the United States, Asia and Europe.

The main event, which was officially opened by a keynote address from Engr. Yinka Abioye kicked of on Monday, 22 September at the Accra International Conference Centre (AICC), after a late call to shift venue from the Independence Square due to inclement weathers. It was attended by the Deputy Governor of Kisumu County, Kenya, Ambassadors Kufa E. Chinoza, Dayo Adeoye and Thando Dalamba, and Mr. Caleb Ampah, who presented UNESCO's solidarity message to FESTAC AFRICA on behalf of UNESCO Representative to Ghana Mr. Edmond Moukala.

While the Accra rendition was slightly smaller than the Kisumu edition, the presence of AUDA-NEPAD and UNESCO was a major milestone in the history of FESTAC AFRICA renaissance. UNESCO, having played a pivotal role in FESTAC '77 continue to collaborate with cultural programs across Africa under the auspices of the United Nations, while AUDA-NEPAD is African Union's technical and implementation agency.

Beyond Pan-African dialogues and cultural performances, the event featured two major culinary experiences, first of them being the South African Heritage Day barbecue grill, a competition between Zimbabwean and South African meats held on Wednesday, 24 September, while the second one was the Nigerian vs Ghanaian Jollof Rice competition held on Friday, 26 September. It also featured a walk to Aburi Mountain - a health and wellness exercise aimed at creating awareness on the negative impacts of the illegal gold mining in Ghana / galamsey.
