= Ibrahima Kébé (painter) =

Senegalese Soninke painter (1955–2019)

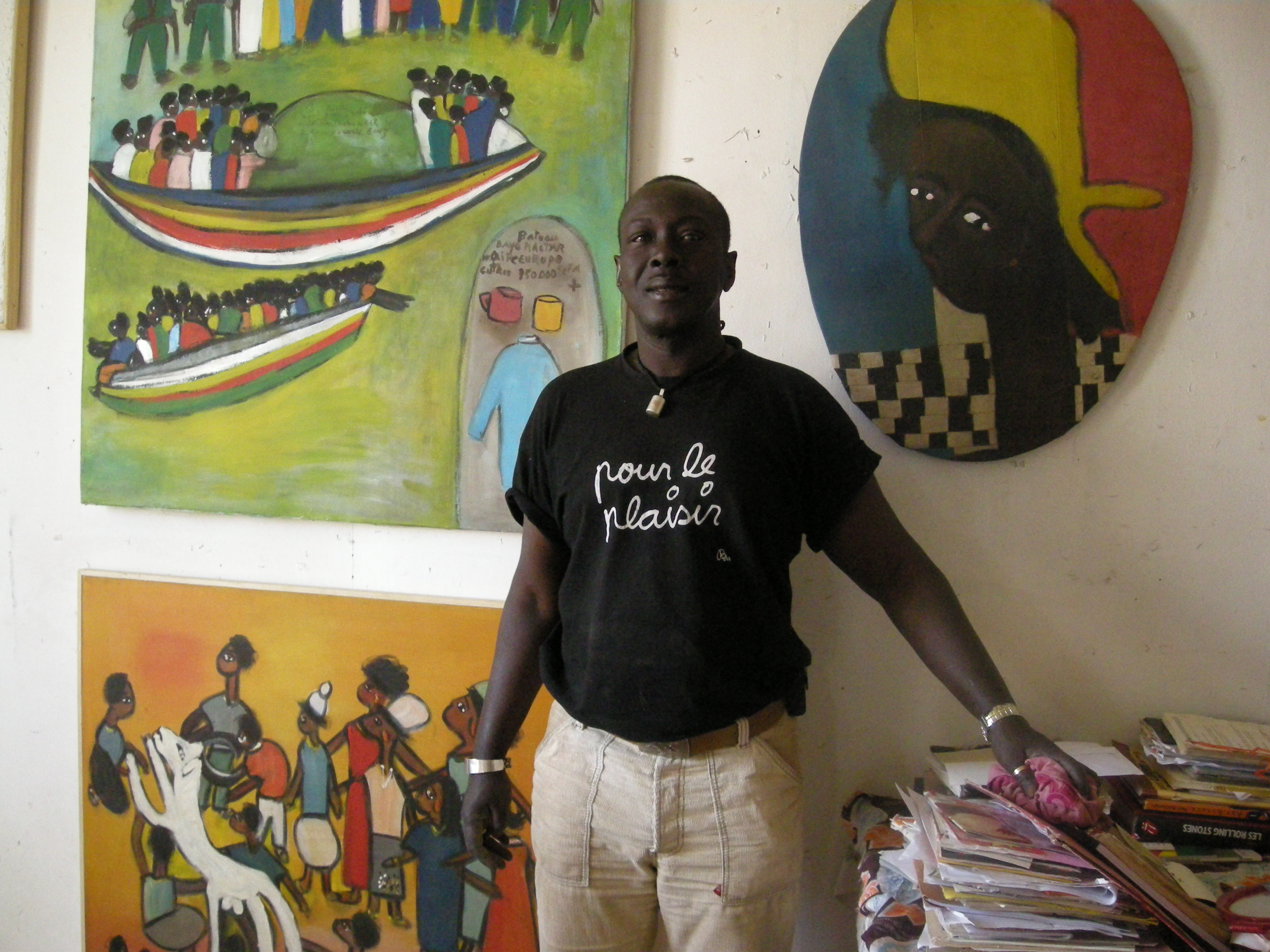
- La tragédie du Joola
- Born: October 2, 1955; Kaolack
- Died: September 8, 2019 (aged 63)
- Occupation: Painter

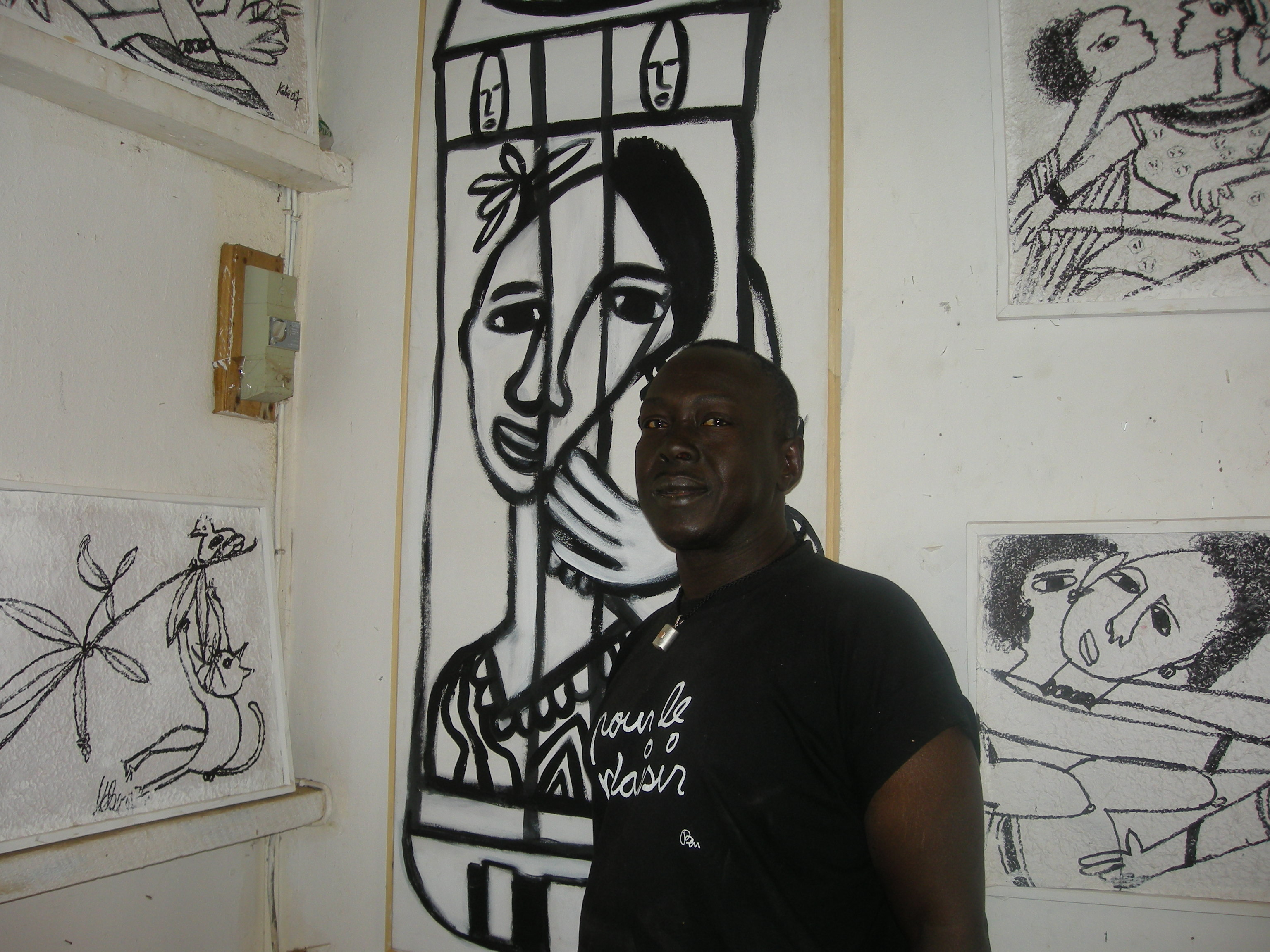
Black and white works

Ibrahima Kébé (Kaolack, October 2, 1955 – Dakar, September 8, 2019) was a Senegalese Soninke painter. He lived his entire life in Village des Arts de Dakar.

== Biography ==
Ibrahima Kébé was born in Kaolack, Senegal on October 2, 1955. He was of Sarakhol origin.

Kébé studied at School of Fine Arts in Dakar.

His art focused on everyday life, and he had exhibitions in Senegal, Belgium, and Germany.

He was resident at the Village des Arts in Dakar.

He died on September 8, 2019.

== Selection of work ==
- Unequal sharing, 1982
- The cry of youth, 1983
- Research Notice, 1996
- Woman in power, 1997
- Swimmers, 1998
- Woman with balafon, 1999
- Grouping, 1999
- Affectivity, 1999
- Big family in black and white, 2002
- Grouping of Wise Men, 2004
- The young boy, 2004
- Happy couple, 2004
- Twilight of men, 2004
- Serenity, 2004
- Confidential letter, 2004
- The big kiss, 2004
- The friends of the sun, 2004
- The fiancée du ciel, 2004
