= Cuties =

2020 film by Maïmouna Doucouré

- Theatrical release poster
- French: Mignonnes
- Directed by: Maïmouna Doucouré
- Written by: Maïmouna Doucouré
- Produced by: Zangro
- Starring: Fathia Youssouf; Médina El Aidi-Azouni; Esther Gohourou; Ilanah Cami-Goursolas; Maïmouna Gueye
- Cinematography: Yann Maritaud
- Edited by: Mathilde Van de Moortel; Stéphane Mazalaigue
- Music by: Niko Noki
- Production companies: France TV Cinéma; Bien ou Bien Productions
- Distributed by: BAC Films
- Release dates: 23 January 2020 (Sundance); 19 August 2020 (France)
- Running time: 96 minutes
- Country: France
- Language: French
- Box office: $692,459

Cuties (French: Mignonnes) is a 2020 French coming-of-age drama film written and directed by Maïmouna Doucouré in her feature directorial debut. The film's ensemble cast is led by Fathia Youssouf who portrays Amy, a Senegalese-French girl with a traditional Muslim upbringing who is caught between traditional Muslim values and Internet culture when she joins a twerking dance crew.

Doucouré was inspired to write the script upon seeing a suggestive youth talent show one day, as well as from her experience as a Senegalese-French person. She said that it is intended to criticise the hypersexualisation of pre-adolescent girls, and that she logged over 18 months of research on the topic. The script later won an award at the 2017 Sundance Film Festival. Casting took six months, with 700 girls being auditioned for the role of Amy. Principal photography lasted three months, with a psychologist assisting the child actresses throughout.

Cuties premiered at the 2020 Sundance Film Festival on 23 January, where Doucouré won the Directing Award. It was released in France on 19 August 2020 by BAC Films and internationally on 9 September 2020 on Netflix. While critical response to the film was mostly positive, including some award nominations, it became a subject of controversy, starting from Netflix's initial promotional poster that was widely considered inappropriate. Following its release on Netflix, the film polarized audiences, in part due to sexually suggestive scenes involving the child actors.

== Plot ==
Amy, an 11-year-old girl from Senegal, lives with her mother Mariam and two younger brothers, one of them named Ishmael, in an apartment in one of Paris' poorest neighbourhoods. She is angered by her polygynous father, who is preparing to return with a second wife. She is also bored with Islamic culture that her aunt seeks to impose on her. Amy is fascinated by her disobedient neighbour Angelica's pre-teen twerking clique, the Cuties, which is in stark contrast to Mariam's Muslim customs. They do not hesitate to adopt revealing outfits against their older rivals, the Sweety Swags. In the quest for online recognition, Amy decides to incorporate suggestive dance moves into the choreography. After getting pantsed for fighting with Sweety Swags, she steals her cousin’s phone and sends a photo of her vulva online to a social network in an attempt to look mature, backfiring heavily with her being ostracised, also causing a rift between her and the Cuties who kick her out, replaced with former member Yasmine. Her mother also confronts her for committing such indecency. She and her aunt try performing an exorcism on Amy, but it fails.

While her father's wedding day corresponds to the finale at the Parc de la Villette, she is determined to dance with them, and sneaks out of the house. She pushes Yasmine into a canal, so the Cuties have no choice but to allow her to dance with them. The highly suggestive dance routine polarizes audiences. Suddenly thinking about her mother during the routine, Amy bursts into tears and leaves before their performance ends. Upon her return, she runs into her aunt, who blames her for her outfit and recent attitude. Amy's mother intervenes by telling her to leave her daughter alone and then hugs her to reassure her. Amy implores her mother to not attend the wedding. Amy's mother permits her not to go, but states that she herself must go to fulfill her duty as a wife. In the end, Amy abandons both the traditional wedding dress and her provocative dancer's outfit, living a normal youth lifestyle.

== Cast ==
- Fathia Youssouf as Amy
- Médina El Aidi-Azouni as Angelica
- Maïmouna Gueye as Mariam, Amy's mother
- Esther Gohourou as Coumba, a member of the Cuties
- Ilanah Cami-Goursolas as Jess, another member of the Cuties
- Myriam Hamma as Yasmine, another member of the Cuties
- Mbissine Therese Diop as Amy's aunt
- Demba Diaw as Ishmael, Amy's brother
- Mamadou Samaké as Samba

== Production ==
The film was announced by filmmaker Maïmouna Doucouré as her feature debut directorial venture. She rose to prominence with her 2016 short film Maman(s), which was selected and premiered in over two hundred film festivals, and won around sixty awards in several international film festivals.

Doucouré penned the script for Cuties, taking her life experience as a refugee girl into account. The script eventually won Sundance's Global Filmmaking Award in 2017. Doucouré says her inspiration for the film was a talent show in Paris that she happened to see. She says that the contrast of the dancing and the traditional garb of the families in the audience was fascinating. She also based it on her own experience with the contrast of the cultures of France and Senegal.

Doucouré spent nearly 18 months researching studies on how young and pre-teen children are being exposed to adult content and sexualised images on social media in order to showcase the accurate reality in the film. She spoke to many young girls about these issues. She says that the film deals with self-image and social media. "Our girls see that the more a woman is overly sexualised on social media, the more she is successful. Children just imitate what they see, trying to achieve the same result without understanding the meaning. It is dangerous." She says that although watching the film may be difficult, it is important to have a conversation in society about these issues.

Casting for the film took nearly six months. Approximately 650 girls auditioned for the main character Amy; ultimately, 11-year-old Fathia Youssouf was chosen. Principal photography took place in various locations around France over a period of three months. Doucouré said she "created a climate of trust" between the young actors and herself during filming. She stated while working on the film, "I explained to them everything I was doing and the research that I had done before I wrote this story. I was also lucky that these girls' parents were also activists, so we were all on the same side. At their age, they've seen this kind of dance. Any child with a telephone can find these images on social media these days." She also stated that a child psychologist was on staff during filming.

== Initial release ==
Cuties had its world premiere in the World Cinema Dramatic Competition section of the 2020 Sundance Film Festival on 23 January, where Doucouré won the Directing Award, and was one of three French films to be screened at festival. Originally set for a theatrical release in France on 1 April 2020, the film was delayed due to the COVID-19 pandemic in France, and was eventually released on 19 August 2020 by BAC Films. The film earned US$692,459; in its opening day it earned US$644,309 at 169 theaters.

== Netflix release ==
In January 2020, prior to the film's Sundance premiere, Netflix purchased the worldwide rights to the film, excluding France. It was released internationally on Netflix on 9 September 2020. Cuties was removed from Netflix's catalogue on 8 September 2024 after Netflix's license to stream the film expired.

=== Marketing ===
The original Cuties film poster used by Netflix. It was later replaced following criticism.

Prior to its release on Netflix, the film had not been deemed controversial when it was screened at Sundance and released in France. After Netflix acquired Cuties, its international promotional poster and trailer for the film were criticised for allegedly sexualising 11-year-old girls and were different from those used to promote the film in its original release in France. The Parents Television Council (PTC) requested that Netflix remove the film entirely, and a Change.org petition calling for people to cancel their Netflix subscription gathered more than 600,000 signatures. Followers of QAnon on social media also criticised the film, and a moderator on the movies and television board of 4chan banned images pertaining to the film from being posted on the imageboard site. In Latin America, #NetflixPedofilia trended on Twitter prior to the film's Netflix release.

In response, Netflix replaced the poster with a new one, stating, "This was not an accurate representation of the film so the image and description has been updated." The new poster was replaced with that of the original theatrical release, depicting the girls running in the street with shopping bags while celebrating.

Amidst the controversy, American actress Tessa Thompson came out in support of the film when it was criticised on social media, stating that "Cuties is a beautiful film" and said that the film "gutted me" when she saw it for the first time during the Sundance premiere.

In Turkey, the Ministry of Family asked Radio and Television Supreme Council (RTÜK) to take the necessary precautions and evaluate the film; RTÜK subsequently demanded the film be removed from the Netflix catalogue. Netflix removed the film from its catalogue in Turkey two days before its release. In September 2020, Pakistani actor Hamza Ali Abbasi signed one of the petitions and demanded Netflix cancel their planned release of the film. Adriana Martínez Bedini, vice-president of Buenos Aires' Consejo de los Derechos de Niñas, Niños y Adolescentes (Council for the Rights of Girls, Boys and Teenagers), called for "being very careful not to eroticize childhood. Its consequences in society can be serious", adding that the topic would be included in the council plenary.

In an interview with Deadline Hollywood, Maïmouna Doucouré stated that she received numerous death threats and personal attacks following the backlash on social media. She claimed that things happened fairly quickly (after delays due to the COVID-19 pandemic); she was focusing solely on the film's theatrical release in France, and at the time was not consulted about the controversial poster unveiled by Netflix. She said that she was notified of the film's poster controversy after being informed of negative feedback and reviews from the public on social media, and that the co-CEO of Netflix phoned her directly and apologised for the poster release.

=== International release ===
On 10 September, #CancelNetflix started trending on Twitter in the United States (one day after the release of the film internationally) with The Guardian saying that opposition came from across the political spectrum. Michelle Jaworski of The Daily Dot said that part of the outrage was based on clips of the film that were taken out of context. Subscribers of Netflix repeatedly threatened to cancel their subscriptions following the release of the film on the platform. It became the second Netflix film in 2020 to have received severe backlash and condemnation among the public regarding accusations of inappropriate culture portrayal, following 365 Days. Shortly after its release on Netflix, Cuties had an IMDb rating of 1.7/10, and was review bombed on most review platforms.

In response, Netflix defended Cuties, saying that the film is a piece of "social commentary against the sexualisation of young children" and encouraged subscribers to watch it. In a further interview, Doucouré claimed that people upset with her film have not streamed it, stating: "I realise that the people who have started this controversy haven't yet seen the film. Netflix has apologised to the public and to myself. I'm hoping that these people will watch the movie now that it's out. I'm eager to see their reaction when they realise that we're both on the same side of this fight against young children's hypersexualisation."

The National Center on Sexual Exploitation, a conservative religious organisation formerly known as Morality in Media, condemned Netflix for giving a film "that has permitted the sexual exploitation of children" a platform and called for the company to cut the "sexually-exploitative scenes or stop hosting this film at all".

Forbes noted that the film does not contain any child pornography, such as explicit nudity of a minor. The French directors guild criticised the backlash against the film, calling it a "grave attack on freedom of creation" being fueled by "the most conservative of Americans." French organisation UniFrance also condemned the backlash towards the film, saying in a statement that the backlash "pose[s] a serious threat to the very space that cinema seeks to open up: a space of discussion, reflection, and of helping us to see beyond our own preconceived ideas."

Despite the controversy, the film reached the top 5 on Netflix in the United States, as well as the top 10 in 17 other countries. In a poll by Screen Engine/ASI of 96 U.S. Netflix subscribers 52% of people said they only watched the film due to the controversy, while 29% said it was a major factor in their choice to watch the film. After watching the film 72% said the controversy was "overblown" with 38% strongly agreeing. Overall 48% strongly agreed that the film should not be available on Netflix, while 17% somewhat agreed.

However, it has also been noted that there was a decrease in renewals to Netflix, likely due to the film. The days after the film's release saw an eight times increase in the number of cancellations of Netflix subscriptions than typical, reaching "a multi-year high", according to data analytics companies Antenna and YipitData. Research firm 7Park Data noted that the surge in Netflix cancellations died down within a week of the initial uproar.

In September 2020, in an interview hosted by UniFrance, Doucouré reflected that the film became controversial primarily due to the artwork used by Netflix. In the interview, she rejected the claim that the controversy originated in cultural differences between European and American viewers. She insisted that she shares the spirit and fight against sexualisation of children similar to those who criticised the film. Doucouré reaffirmed her intentions for making the film in an op-ed for The Washington Post, and responded to the controversy saying, "The movie has certainly started a debate, though not the one that I intended." She also said, "It's my sincerest hope that this conversation doesn't become so difficult that it too gets caught up in today's 'cancel culture.'"

=== U.S. political responses ===
Letter by 34 members of Congress to U.S Attorney General William Barr, recommending he bring charges against Netflix over its distribution of Cuties

U.S. Senator Josh Hawley of Missouri informally invited Netflix to discuss the film "before Congress" in a tweet. U.S. Senator Mike Lee of Utah sent a letter directly to Netflix CEO Reed Hastings, and requested "an explanation on Hasting's [sic] views as to whether or not the potential exploitation of minors in this film constitutes criminal behavior". U.S. House Representative Tulsi Gabbard of Hawaii explicitly called the film "child porn" and that it would "whet the appetite of pedophiles [and] help fuel the child sex trafficking trade." U.S. Senator Ted Cruz of Texas sent a letter to the Department of Justice to "investigate whether Netflix, its executives, or the filmmakers violated any federal laws against the production and distribution of child pornography." Christine Pelosi, daughter of U.S. House Speaker Nancy Pelosi, stated that Cuties "hypersexualises girls my daughter's age no doubt to the delight of pedophiles like the ones I prosecuted." Senator Tom Cotton of Arkansas and Representative Jim Banks of Indiana also both criticised the film in separate statements, calling for the U.S. Department of Justice to take legal action against Netflix, with Cotton saying "There's no excuse for the sexualisation of children, and Netflix's decision to promote the film Cuties is disgusting at best and a serious crime at worst". Representatives Ken Buck of Colorado and Andy Biggs of Arizona also called for the Department of Justice to investigate. The state attorneys general of Ohio, Florida, Louisiana, and Texas have also written a letter to Netflix asking for removal of the film. Donald Trump Jr., son of then-President Donald Trump, also condemned the film in a campaign event in Arizona saying "You know what the left is doing? They're justifying Cuties, they're justifying pedophilia."

On 23 September 2020, Netflix was indicted by a grand jury in Tyler County, Texas, on a charge that it "depicts the lewd exhibition of the genitals or pubic area of a clothed or partially clothed child who was younger than 18 years of age ... and has no serious literary, artistic, political, or scientific value." In response, Netflix continued to defend the film in a statement saying, "Cuties is a social commentary against the sexualization of young children. This charge is without merit and we stand by the film." Thomas Leatherbury, director of the First Amendment clinic at Southern Methodist University, said the indictment was an "unusual test case", adding that it's "troubling" that there is a "criminal charge related to First Amendment activity, particularly expressive activity, like a movie." The Texas-based defense lawyer Paul Saputo called the indictment "one of 'the dumbest and most absurd' in the state", noting its win at Sundance qualifies the film as having serious artistic value. Former federal prosecutor Duncan Levin also stated that the indictment was "more of a culture wars attack on a sexualized film than a law enforcement issue." The National Society of Film Critics also spoke out against the indictment, calling it "utterly baseless" and "absurd". The case was dismissed without prejudice in 2022.

=== Netflix responses ===
On 12 October 2020, during a MIPCOM Online+ keynote address, Netflix co-CEO Ted Sarandos continued to defend the film. "Frankly, I'm surprised there hasn't been more discussion about the First Amendment implications of this film. It's a film I would argue is very misunderstood with some audiences, uniquely in the United States...It's the director's story and the film has obviously played very well at Sundance, without any of this kind of controversy and played in theaters throughout Europe without any of this controversy, ...I think it's a little surprising that in 2020 in America, we're having a discussion about censoring storytelling."

In November 2020, it was reported that Netflix sent dozens of takedown requests to Twitter targeting specific posts that criticise Cuties. One user whose tweets were removed said it was "a clear violation of our First Amendment rights", while another user stated it was "just sad", and added "shame on Netflix and Twitter for taking away people's voices. That is how I feel." TorrentFreak said the cluster of copyright claims by Netflix was unusual.

== Reception ==
=== Critical response ===
On Rotten Tomatoes, the film holds an approval rating of 86% based on 81 reviews, with an average rating of 7/10. The site's critics consensus reads: "A thoughtful look at the intricacies of girlhood in the modern age, Cuties is a coming-of-age film that confronts its themes with poignancy and nuance." At Metacritic, the film has a weighted average score of 67 out of 100, based on 16 critics, indicating "generally favorable reviews".

Monica Castillo of RogerEbert.com gave the film four out of four stars, stating that "Cuties is a difficult and challenging film, pushing the idea of 'depiction does not equal endorsement' to its limit." In a review for IndieWire, Kate Erbland wrote, "Although Doucouré steeps Cuties in emotion and experience, she abandons its grace to make crazier gestures." Variety's Amy Nicholson wrote: "Newcomer Youssouf has an anchoring presence. Occasionally, Doucouré lets her light up the screen with a smile, and at the director's most expressionistic, the girl floats", though it stated the film is aiming to gain more "gasps than laughs" with its dance numbers. Other reviewers commented that the film is intended to criticise "a culture that steers impressionable young girls toward the hypersexualisation of their bodies" and "seems to want to provoke censure". Clarisse Fabre of Le Monde praised the film and said that it avoids judging the sexualised dances of the girls.

French newspaper Libération described the film as "endearing but too demonstrative", adding that "the film remains on the threshold of the discomfort that it intends to press each time it meets the male gaze, as if it was afraid to blame it head on". According to France Info, "Mignonnes' words are a subtle reflection on the condition of women when childhood and innocence discreetly recede" and a "female cast carried by the intensity of the young Fathia Youssouf, a revelation".

David Fear of Rolling Stone rated the film 3 out of 5 stars, calling it a "sensitive portrait of growing pains that deserves to be seen". Common Sense Media gave the film 4 out of 5 stars and wrote that "Maïmouna Doucouré has created an evocative, compassionate portrait of young girls finding their identity and values". Alyssa Rosenberg of The Washington Post defended the film, stating that the film would be liked by those who have not seen a glimpse of it yet, and she also criticised the remarks made against the film. Carlos Aguilar of TheWrap compared Cuties to films such as Girlhood (2014), The Fits (2015) and Atlantics (2019).

Fionnuala Halligan of Screen Daily, however, commented on the close-up minor shots: "Doucouré seems to want to provoke censure, but fails precisely because she's trying so hard." She also called the musical shots "outrageous", but also said that "[a]ll four Cuties members give excellent performances." Yvonne Bohwongprasert of the Bangkok Post stated that the film's storyline "sexualises the girls in a manner that would pander to the desires of a paedophile" with "a plot that really does not make sense."

=== Accolades ===
Award nominations for Cuties
Ceremony	Award	Category	Nominee	Result
Berlin International Film Festival	Generation Prize	Best Film	Maïmouna Doucouré; Bien Ou Bien Productions	Nominated
Berlin International Film Festival	Crystal Bear	Generation Kplus – Best Film	Maïmouna Doucouré	Nominated
Sundance Film Festival	World Cinema Dramatic Competition	Directing Award – Dramatic	Maïmouna Doucouré	Won
Sundance Film Festival	World Cinema Dramatic Competition	Grand Jury Prize – Dramatic	Maïmouna Doucouré	Nominated
Gotham Awards	Gotham Independent Film Awards	Best International Feature	Maïmouna Doucouré	Nominated
César Awards	46th César Awards	Most Promising Actress	Fathia Youssouf	Won
César Awards	46th César Awards	Best First Feature Film	Maïmouna Doucouré	Nominated

== See also ==
- Anti-pedophile activism – Form of activism
- Bombay Begums – Indian drama series
- Sexualization in child beauty pageants
