= Sexualization in child beauty pageants =

Sexualization in child beauty pageants has been the topic of controversy and debate. Since all contestants for these pageants are minors, there are concerns regarding the potential long-term impacts early sexualization can have on their psyche. These impacts can negatively affect a contestant's self-esteem and relationship with their own bodies throughout their lives due to hyperfixation on achieving professional adult aesthetics at a young age. In more extreme cases, the impacts of early sexualization in pageants can lead to various psychological disorders such as depression, anxiety disorder, and various eating disorders. However, there is also support of children competing in beauty pageants due to the way contestants are challenged to have more confidence in order to be able to compete successfully in these pageants.

== Background ==
There are several components to child sexualization that set it apart from healthy sexuality. Objectification occurs when a person's value comes only from their sexual appeal or behavior, to the exclusion of other characteristics.

A report by the American Psychological Association more specifically cites sexuality that is imposed on someone, rather than undertaken by choice, as evidence of sexualization. In the United States, the age of legal adulthood and ability to give legally-recognized consent for sexual activity varies from 16 to 18 years of age.

As Vernon R. Wiehe, a professor in the University of Kentucky College of Social Work, states, "sexualization occurs through little girls wearing adult women's clothing in diminutive sizes, the use of makeup which often is applied by makeup consultants, spray tanning the body, the dying of hair and the use of hair extensions, and assuming provocative postures more appropriate for adult models". Many view the child's appearance as obscene or inappropriate.

In preparation for these pageants, children have their appearances altered by costumes, makeup, and other products, which sexualize them at a very young age. The child perceives that sexuality is not only encouraged but can be a means to an end. The child pageant industry involves thousands of contestants and $5 billion a year in revenue, and television networks air in-demand shows like Toddlers & Tiaras and Little Miss Perfect.

=== Bikini contests of minors ===
Miss Tanguita, which translates as "Miss Little Thong", is held in Barbosa, Santander, Colombia as an annual part of the "del Rio Suarez" Festival. Activists say that the competition, though legal, abuses the human rights of minors.

Beginning in 2016, the Miss Teen USA pageant removed the swimsuit competition and replaced it with an athleticwear round.

== Training for beauty pageants ==
The training for child beauty pageant competitors includes long hours and strict daily routines. During training periods, they are often pushed beyond their limits and denied necessary rest. Parents can pay for private coaching, teach their children themselves, or enroll them in pageant schools. Although these children are working long hours throughout the week for the financial gain of their parents, child labor laws in the United States do not apply to them and the practice remains mostly unregulated.

== Support for participation ==
Despite widespread criticism of child beauty pageants, contestants' parents continue to argue for the positive impact that they have on their children's personal development. Supporters often cite self-confidence and poise as attributes that they learn during the pageant process, and still more defend pageants as being similar to other athletic, music, or educational programs. Since many young girls like playing dress up and enjoy participating in beauty pageants, they argue, that they are positive events. The Pageant Director for the Cities of America preliminary pageant system echoes these sentiments and argues that pageants are good for girls—they develop self-confidence by actively trying to be a part of something, they compete with others through a fair process and enjoy meeting others with similar interests. Being able to communicate and network with others is an important skill that children learn at a young age when participating in beauty pageants. Through pageants, they also learn how to communicate with adults.

One mother insists that pageants have helped her daughter "gain poise, confidence, showmanship, discipline and grace." This may be true for some contestants, as the child's attitude typically derives from the parent. When the parents embrace a positive attitude, the children usually follow. In these cases, pageants can teach children how to be gracious winners and good losers. They will learn the aspects of rules and fair play. Thus, pageants teach them how to be calm, cool, and collected in front of crowds. Supporters believe participants learn tenacity when they fail and must move on, and they practice arduously trying to achieve something which proves even more valuable when they are successful.

From some child contestants' perspectives, pageants are fun. A young contestant interviewed on NBC Today said that pageants are fun and that they like to make new friends, and that it makes them happy for their friends when they win. Another contestant said that it feels good to win.

== Criticism of sexualization in child pageants ==
There is a wide scope of criticisms regarding children participating in beauty pageants. A writer for the New York Times criticized child beauty pageants because participants and viewers impose adulthood on children while still expecting them to radiate innocence. The appeal of child beauty pageants in this context is the simultaneous existence of adult sexuality and childhood innocence in the contestants.

In 1996, footage of 6-year-old JonBenét Ramsey was broadcast on television across the U.S. of her performing onstage wearing a skimpy outfit with full makeup and hair during a child beauty pageant—viewers felt as if they were watching "child pornography". However, the coverage of her murder investigation became a public spectacle due to the surrounding scandal regarding her hypersexuality in her pageant performances. The scandal marked one of the first instances of the public questioning the practices that take place in child beauty pageants, as the discourse around her adult and sexualized image played a key role in her trials.

Children develop a sense of sexual identity during the ages of adolescence and sexualization makes this task a greater priority during their youth. When parents enter their child into beauty competitions they are encouraging their children to engage in behaviors and practices that are socially associated with sexiness. With popularity of similar child beauty pageant television shows like Toddlers & Tiaras, the public is concerned that young contestants are being displayed as objects of sexual desire to their audience. Reality shows such as Toddlers & Tiaras reinforce the dominant perception of women's worth being inherently and directly linked to their sexual desirability. The reality shows that document the journey of young children through pageant competitions are centred around the physical transformation of the contestants from a typical childish aesthetic to a mature woman's aesthetic. Through observing and learning from the way their environment praises these physical transformations, child contestants in these pageants come to learn that their gender identity is a performed concept and the more sexual, mature, and feminine this performance is, the more they are succeeding in performing womanhood.

Children are in child beauty pageants solely because of their age. These children are judged along with the same criteria as an adult pageant woman would be judged on. Since the children are aware that their performance is expected to be the portrayal of adult womanhood, it indirectly teaches them that womanhood cannot exist without sexuality. The indirect lessons impact the mindset of young girls in the long term due to its implications regarding gender performance.

There is controversy around the Glitz Child Beauty Pageants due to contestants dramatically enhancing their appearances and provocative performances. Performances and image alterations like the ones displayed in glitz pageants encourage young contestants to believe that having glitz beauty is the only way to gain success in both their pageant and non-pageant lives. Due to the way these pageants are set up so children are directly competing against other children, they come to understand that it is obligatory for them to perform adult "sexiness" in order to receive positive attention and praise from their own parents.

== Consequences of child sexualization in child pageants ==
In reports of children being sexually abused, research shows that the sexualization of children is a contributing factor to their abuse. People with ill intent will videotape these girls and use them for unorthodox purposes. This will lead them to later on feel scared. Also, if a child is winning constantly in a competition that is based primarily on their looks, they are more likely to develop psychological issues later on in life, such as depression, low self-esteem, and eating disorders. There is also a link to lowered sexual efficacy and contraceptive use later in life.

"'Some critics contend that the child beauty pageant culture fails to acknowledge that "sexualized images of little girls may have dangerous implications in a world where 450,000 American children were reported as victims of sexual abuse in 1993."

The hyper attention and judgement towards children's physical appearance in child beauty pageants increases their risk of developing various forms of eating disorders. Some of these eating disorders that have long-lasting physiological and psychological impacts include anorexia and bulimia.

The psychological problems related to perceptions of the self are long lasting and carry on into adolescence and adulthood due to the hyperfixation on their physical appearance at an early age. The implications regarding the achievement of "perfection" and the perception of body image that have been taught to them remain engrained in the way they view themselves long after they retire from pageant competitions and transition into adulthood. Since mothers are usually the parent who is emotionally involved in their child's participation in pageants, there is a lot of information regarding their outlook on the contests. Some of the immense pressure that is put on child beauty pageant contestants are attributed to the overcompensation of pageant moms due to their own insecurities. As a result of these mother's constant pushing, many of these young girls feel as if they let their mothers down by failing to achieve the unattainable standards of beauty and sexuality that is set for them.

In France, Senators voted to ban child beauty pageants altogether. The ban took the form of an amendment to the already established women's rights law and condemned all these pageants for violating children's equal rights due to their objectification in child beauty pageant competitions.

== See also ==
- Child erotica
- Cuties
