= Black Girl (1966 film) =

French-Senegalese film by Ousmane Sembène

- French theatrical release poster
- French: La Noire de…
- Directed by: Ousmane Sembène
- Written by: Ousmane Sembène
- Produced by: André Zwoboda
- Starring: Mbissine Thérèse Diop; Anne-Marie Jelinek; Robert Fontaine
- Cinematography: Christian Lacoste
- Edited by: André Gaudier
- Production company: Filmi Domirev; Les Actualités Françaises
- Distributed by: Studio 43 (France)
- Release date: 1966
- Running time: 65 minutes
- Countries: Senegal; France
- Language: French

Black Girl (French: La noire de..., lit. 'Black girl of...') is a 1966 drama film, written and directed by Senegalese filmmaker Ousmane Sembène in his feature directorial debut. It is based on a short story from Sembène's 1962 collection Voltaique, which was in turn inspired by a real life incident.

It stars Mbissine Thérèse Diop as Diouana, a young Senegalese woman who moves from her native Dakar to Antibes, France, to work for a French couple. In France, Diouana hopes to continue her former job as a nanny and anticipates a new cosmopolitan lifestyle. However, upon her arrival in Antibes, Diouana experiences harsh treatment from the couple, who force her to work as a servant. She becomes increasingly aware of her constrained and alienated situation and starts to question her life in France.

Black Girl is often considered the first Sub-Saharan African film by an African filmmaker to receive international attention. Although it was poorly received by Western film critics upon its initial release, by the 2010s it came to be seen as a classic of world cinema.

== Plot ==
The plot continually shifts back and forth between Diouana's present life in France, where she works as a domestic servant, and flashbacks to her previous life in Senegal.

In the flashbacks, it is revealed that she comes from a poor village outside Dakar. Most of her contemporaries are illiterate, and Diouana would roam the city looking for a job. One day, a Frenchwoman named 'Madame' comes to the square looking for a servant and selects Diouana from among the unemployed women. Diouana is chosen because she does not aggressively demand a job like the other women; unlike the others, she does not crowd forward demanding employment. Initially, Madame hires Diouana to care for her children in Dakar. As a gift, Diouana gives her employers a traditional mask that she had bought from a small boy for 50 guineas, and they display it in their home. When Diouana is not working, she goes for walks with her boyfriend. Monsieur and Madame then offer Diouana a job working for them in France. Diouana is thrilled and immediately begins dreaming of her new life in France.

Once she arrives, Diouana is overwhelmed with cooking and cleaning for the rich couple and their friends. Madame treats her unkindly, and Diouana is confused about her role. She thought she would be caring for the children as in Senegal and would be able to go outside and explore France. However, in France, she does not leave the apartment and only cooks and cleans inside the house—a stark contrast to her previous life in Senegal, where she spent much time outdoors. When Diouana wears a fancy dress and heels, the mistress of the house tells her to remove them, saying, "Don't forget that you are a maid." At one of the couple's dinner parties, one of their friends kisses Diouana on the cheeks in typical European fashion, explaining, "I've never kissed a black girl before!"

Diouana receives a letter from her mother, which Monsieur reads to her. Diouana's mother asks why she has not heard from her daughter and requests money. Diouana rips the letter up. Madame doesn't allow her to sleep in past breakfast time and yells at her to get to work. Diouana attempts to take back the mask she gave to Madame, and a struggle ensues. Madame tells Diouana that if she does not work, she cannot eat. Consequently, Diouana refuses to work. After Monsieur attempts to pay her salary and Diouana refuses to accept the money, Diouana commits suicide by slitting her throat in the bathtub of the family's home. The film ends with Monsieur journeying to Senegal to return Diouana's suitcase, mask, and money to her family. He offers Diouana's mother money, but she refuses it. As Monsieur leaves the village, the little boy with the mask runs along behind him.

== Cast ==
- Mbissine Thérèse Diop as Gomis Diouana
- Anne-Marie Jelinek as Madame
- Robert Fontaine as Monsieur
- Momar Nar Sene as Diouana's boyfriend

== Production ==
During casting, a photographer working at the Actualitiés Sénégalaises took a photograph of Mbissine Thérèse Diop, which was seen by filmmaker Sembène, who contacted Diop regarding Black Girl. Diop's family was very opposed to Diop's interest in film, but after Sembène visited with Diop she decided to accept the role. Her family and those in her neighborhood did not approve of her choice, and actively scorned her. The film was shot almost entirely in Senegal, and Diouana's lines were dubbed in French by a different person. According to a 2016 interview of Diop, all of the outfits she wears in the film except for the polka-dot dress were her own, as she was a dressmaker.

The screenplay of Black Girl was rejected by the then-head of the Ministry of Cooperation’s Cinema Bureau, which provided funding for French-speaking films, likely because of the film's subject matter. Sembène reduced the film to a length of one hour to comply with the Centre national du cinéma, and production was done with a very low budget. Sembène coined the phrase mégotage (translated as "cigarette-butt cinema") to describe the resourceful nature of his filmmaking.

== Themes ==
This film addresses the effects of colonialism and racism in Africa and Europe. These themes are highlighted through the recurring appearance of an African mask that Diouana gives to her employers on her first day of work at the house in Dakar. They initially put the mask with other pieces of African Art and, later in France, the mask is hung alone on the white wall in the French couple's apartment. The mask has different meanings:

- Mainly, it represents Diouana; at the beginning, when she gives the mask to the French family, they put the mask between other native masks, as she is still in her homeland, surrounded by people that she knows and by a familiar environment. But when they move to France, the mask is alone on a white wall, like Diouana is alone in France, surrounded by white walls and white people.
- The mask can also represent the diaspora of Africans to Europe in the name of material gain, questioning the mobility it promises; a 'visual hegemony' that mirrors an uprooted population under colonialism and the legacies that persist.
- Another analogy between the mask and Africa, for example in the last scene, when the white man is followed by the child wearing the mask, it represents the past of Africa that will always haunt its colonizers, but also means the uncertain future of Africa.
- Furthermore, Diouana's last act of defiance is very significant for the African status; Madame and Diouana are contending the mask as France, but more in general, Europe fought for its supremacy on African territories, but at the end the African territories during 20th century gained independence, as Diouana at the end of the fight got the mask.

The mask is a symbol of unity and identity, but today for the non-Africans it is only a 'souvenir'.

The mask represents Diouana's new home. Masks in Africa are where spirits of the dead reside and where they continue to be part of the living. In combination with the boy, this scene is a powerful testimony that came to be a classic in African scene cinema. Diouana is not dead. She is part of the future (represented by the child): The scene means "The future is watching you".

As the film progresses, Diouana is shown as becoming increasingly depressed and lonely. Each day, her African identity deteriorates as she is seen as nothing but a servant to Madame. Theorists have explained that placing any human being in an inferior position in the context of discourse causes great mental strain. Fanon argues that it causes both the mind and body to feel inferior causing the colonized to feel less like a human being. This is the experience Diouana has. The film portrays how colonialism can break down an individual's whole mindset, and cause them to face personal damage on top of the destruction already being caused through colonialism.

The concept of literacy is additionally a very valuable aspect of the portrayal of colonialism. Author Rachel Langford expresses its importance and the way Diouana's identity is ripped from her. Due to her illiteracy, when a letter is sent to Diouana by her mother, Madame and Monsieur take it upon themselves to write Diouana's response for her, asking her to correct them if they get anything wrong. While Diouana is suffering, they begin to express to her mother that she is having a lovely and fulfilling time in France. Diouana becomes enraged, narrating that this is not her letter, although not correcting the couple. This scenario is significant to the theme of colonialism as Diouana is not developing her own life and personality. It is created for her by the colonizer. The film shows the damage that colonialism can cause an individual.

In terms of its representation of racism, it is expressed through the relationship of Diouana and Madame. These characters represent the issue of power relations between Africa and the Western state. The beginning of the film shows a large group of women who wait on the side of the street every morning in hopes they will be hired. This simple scene immediately shows the power difference between the two states. Each of these women dreams of living a fantasy life when arriving in Europe, but are faced with a negative reality. When Diouana is hired and arrives in France, she discovers herself to be in isolation from the world around her and forced to face the issue of racism daily. Even when guests arrive at the house, she is put on show for the guests. Due to the colour of her skin and her country of origin, she is seen as a novelty, not a human to be cared for.

The film highlights societal hierarchy and how race is used to create this division. It is expressed that the social order can only be upheld with the cooperation of both the exploiter and the exploited. The only way to ensure the exploited is obliging is to break their spirit by breaking down their identity, specifically focusing on their race. This is a method used by many colonizers, and is depicted in this film.

== Significance ==
In his 1997 book Movies as Politics, Jonathan Rosenbaum argues that Black Girl is the symbolic genesis of sub-Saharan African filmmaking, at least to the extent that its authorship belonged to a born-and-bred African.

Additionally, the film, told from the perspective of a Senegalese female, serves as a rare reflection of the voices of the colonised. While Senegal had gained independence in 1960 (before the film takes place), colonial oppression persists throughout the film. This is evident in the objectification of Diouana and the suppression of her dreams and ambitions. She is objectified by Madame, who treats her as a servant, as well as by several other characters, including Madame's friend, who kisses Diouana on the cheek in a typical European greeting without asking. Her ambitions are suppressed by both Madame and Diouana's lack of education and finances, although she refuses to accept her salary. Diouana dreams of going to the French shops, seeing the beautiful views, and living a luxurious lifestyle, but she lacks the resources to do so. She attempts to express some part of this dream by wearing dresses and heels while working, but Madame yells at her to take off the clothes and reminds Diouana that she is a maid and has no need for such attire. In doing this, Madame suppresses Diouana's dreams and hopes while asserting the inequality between their characters. To Diouana, France was supposed to be her chance at freedom, wealth, and happiness. Sembène reveals in his film that while Diouana (and the colonized) has the possibility right outside her door, quite literally, she will never be able to achieve her dreams due to the oppression of Madame (the colonizer) and the institutional discrimination embedded in society. The colonizer offers this dream as a way to manipulate the colonized into continued oppression.

== Reception ==
=== Critical reception ===
Critics in the US and Europe did not initially recognize Black Girl's lasting power. A 1969 New York Times review is lukewarm, expressing admiration for the film's "simplicity, sincerity and subdued anger toward the freed black man's new burdens," but finding fault in how it is "unevenly weighted" against the white couple, especially Monsieur, who the reviewer describes as "a gent who is confused but considerate." In a negative 1969 review, Roger Ebert describes the film as "slow and pedestrian." He also complains that "little attempt is made to get into the minds of the characters," particularly the white couple who employ the title character. A 1973 review in The Village Voice calls the film "overly didactic and melodramatic," but recognizes that it offers a valuable African perspective that resonates with audiences in former French colonies.

Still, already in 1981, Angela Davis notes (about domestic workers): "Their tragic predicament is brilliantly captured in the film by Ousmane Sembène entitled La Noire de…"

When critics revisited the film after its restoration in 2016, they found more to praise. In an article on the occasion of Black Girl's fiftieth anniversary, A. O. Scott of The New York Times describes the film as "at once powerfully of its moment and permanently contemporary," adding that "the force of Mr. Sembène's art—the sheer beauty that is the most striking feature of his early films—lies in his humanism." In a 2017 essay for The Criterion Collection, Ashley Clark characterizes Black Girl as an "elegantly stark dramatization of postcolonial pain." He notes that the Madame would be the main character in a Eurocentric version of this story, but that "the focus has shifted entirely" by centering the experience of Diouana, whom Clark describes as a "refreshingly multidimensional character." Writing for The Guardian, Jordan Hoffman describes Black Girl as "dazzling" and "essential viewing for the well-rounded film lover."

=== Awards ===
- 1966, Prix Jean Vigo for best feature film
- 1966, Tanit d'Or, Carthage Film Festival

== See also ==
- Cinema of Senegal
