= Maïmouna Doucouré =

French filmmaker (born 1985)

- Doucouré during a Dublin International Film Festival online event in 2021
- Born: Paris, France
- Citizenship: French
- Education: Pierre and Marie Curie University
- Occupation: Screenwriter, filmmaker
- Known for: Maman(s); Cuties; Hawa

Maïmouna Doucouré ([ma.i.mu.na du.ku.ʁe]; born 1985), is a French screenwriter and film director. She gained international recognition in 2015 with her short film Maman(s).

In 2020, she directed her debut feature film Cuties. Premiering at the Sundance Film Festival, the film won the Directing Award in the World Cinema Dramatic category and received a Special Mention from the international jury at the Berlin International Film Festival in the Generation section.

In France, Cuties was critically acclaimed and received several awards, including the César Award for Most Promising Actress, awarded to lead actress Fathia Youssouf.

In 2019, Doucouré was selected for the Academy Gold Fellowship for Women, a program launched by the Academy of Motion Picture Arts and Sciences.

As of 2025, she is developing a biopic on Josephine Baker, coproduced by Bien ou Bien Productions and StudioCanal, and starring FKA twigs.

== Early life and education ==
Maïmouna Doucouré was born in 1985 in the 19th arrondissement of Paris and grew up in a Senegalese family living in a polygamous household. Her father worked as a street cleaner and her mother was a shopkeeper. After earning a science baccalauréat, she studied biology at Pierre and Marie Curie University (Paris VI), where she obtained a bachelor's degree. Alongside her academic studies, she took acting classes at the Laboratoire de l'Acteur, directed by Hélène Zidi.

She began exploring screenwriting by entering the HLM sur cour competition, organised by the Union sociale pour l’habitat, which she won. This award led to the creation of her first self-produced short film, Cache-Cache (Hide-and-seek, 2013), marking the beginning of her career in filmmaking.

== Career ==
Maïmouna Doucouré's cinematic work is closely tied to her personal background and her dual French-Senegalese cultural heritage. Her films often explore themes such as childhood, identity, and the female condition, conveyed through a sensitive directorial approach that frequently centres on the perspective of children. Her style combines social realism with visual poetry.

=== Maman(s) ===
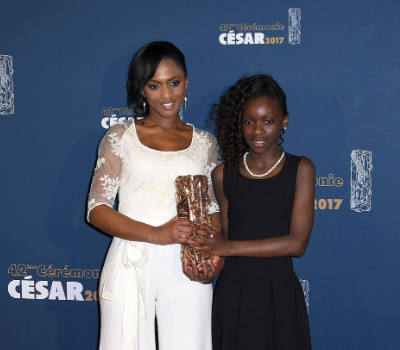
Maïmouna Doucouré and Sokhna Diallo at the César Awards for Maman(s).

In 2015, she produced her second short film, Maman(s), with the assistance of studio Bien ou Bien Productions and producer Zangro. The short film was critically acclaimed for its screenplay and was premiered at the 2015 Toronto International Film Festival, 2016 Sundance Film Festival and also jointly won the César Award for Best Short Film at the 42nd César Awards in 2017 along with Towards Tenderness directed by Alice Diop. During the 2017 Cesar Award ceremony, she reflected her painful experiences of being a black, Muslim female director while working in a white male dominated film industry.

=== Cuties ===
She penned the script for her debut feature film Cuties in early 2017 taking her life experience as a refugee girl into account. The script eventually won the Sundance's Global Filmmaking Award in 2017. The film is based on a traditional Senegalese Muslim girl who is caught and torn between two contrasting fortunes, traditional values and internet culture while also speaking about hypersexualization of preadolescent girls. It premiered in the World Cinema Dramatic Competition sector of 2020 Sundance Film Festival on 23 January 2020 and won the Directing Jury Award praising the script of the film. The film was not deemed controversial when it was premiered at the Sundance Film Festival.

Doucouré said she "created a climate of trust between the children and myself" during filming. She stated while working on the film, "I explained to them everything I was doing and the research that I had done before I wrote this story. I was also lucky that these girls' parents were also activists, so we were all on the same side. At their age, they've seen this kind of dance. Any child with a telephone can find these images on social media these days." She also stated that she worked with a child psychologist during filming. It was revealed that Doucouré spent nearly 18 months researching studies how young and pre-teen children are being exposed to 18+ adult content and sexualised images on social media in order to showcase the accurate reality in the film. She revealed that approximately 700 girls were auditioned to choose the suitable girl to play the lead role.

Despite being critically acclaimed, the film became the subject of public controversy with the release of a promotional poster by Netflix. The social media outrage culminated in a petition claiming it "sexualizes an 11-year-old for the viewing pleasure of paedophiles" attracting 25,000 signatures in less than 24 hours. Doucouré was also targeted directly, receiving multiple death threats, even though the director and Netflix both stated that she had never seen the promotional poster in question, and that any promotion of child sexualization is neither intended nor an accurate representation of the movie. Netflix co-CEO Ted Sarandos apologised to Doucouré and the company removed the poster from the platform.

In September 2020, in an interview hosted by French organisation UniFrance, she reflected that the film became controversial primarily due to Netflix's selection of artwork. She insisted that she also shares the same spirit and fight against sexualisation of children similar to those who have been criticising the film.

=== Hawa ===
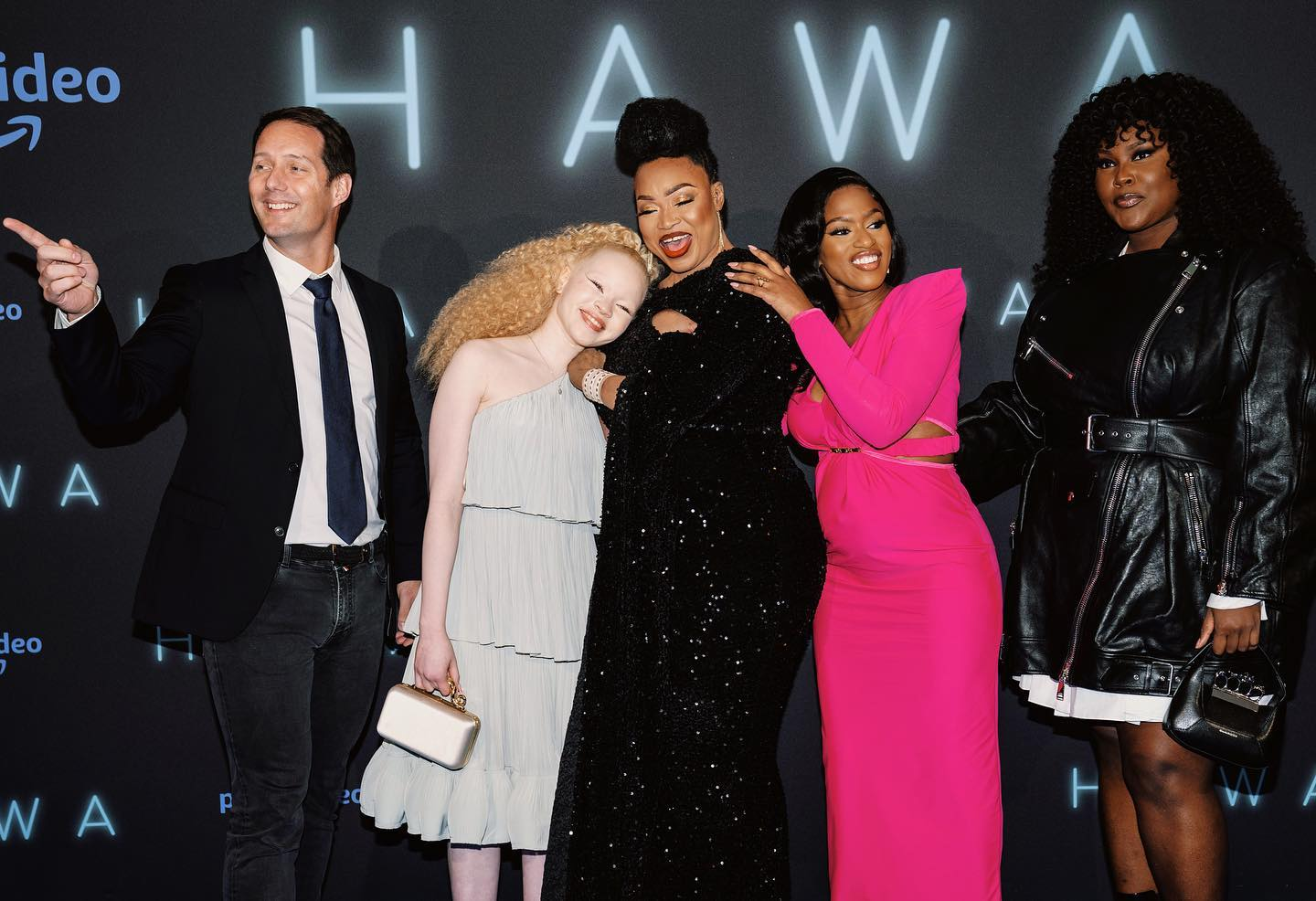
Maïmouna Doucouré attended the premiere of Hawa, accompanied by Sania Halifa, astronaut Thomas Pesquet, and singers Oumou Sangaré and Yseult.

Her second feature film, Hawa, premiered in the Platform Prize lineup at the 2022 Toronto International Film Festival. The film follows an albino teenage girl who dreams of being adopted by Michelle Obama. Through this poetic narrative, Doucouré explores themes of exclusion, childhood, and intergenerational transmission.

=== Josephine Baker ===
In November 2022, Variety announced that Doucouré was working on a biopic about Josephine Baker, with Bien ou Bien Productions and Studiocanal producing the film. Shooting for the film was scheduled to start in 2023.

== Honours and awards ==
=== Honours ===
- Knight of the National Order of Merit – awarded by decree on 7 June 2024
- Knight of the Order of Arts and Letters – 2020

==== For Maman(s) (2015) ====
- César Award for Best Short Film (2017)
- Jury Prize – Sundance Film Festival (2016)
- Best Short Film Award – Toronto International Film Festival (2016)

==== For Mignonnes (Cuties) (2020) ====
- Directing Award – World Cinema Dramatic, Sundance Film Festival
- Special Mention of the Jury – Generation section, Berlin International Film Festival
- Nominated – César Award for Best First Feature Film
- César Award for Most Promising Actress – awarded to Fathia Youssouf
- Alice Guy Prize (2021)

== Filmography ==
=== Short-films ===
Year	Film
2013	Hide-and-seek
2015	Maman(s)

=== Feature-films ===
Year	Film	Notes
2020	Cuties	
2022	Hawa	
TBA	Josephine Baker	In production
