= Yseult (singer) =

French singer, songwriter and model (born 1994)

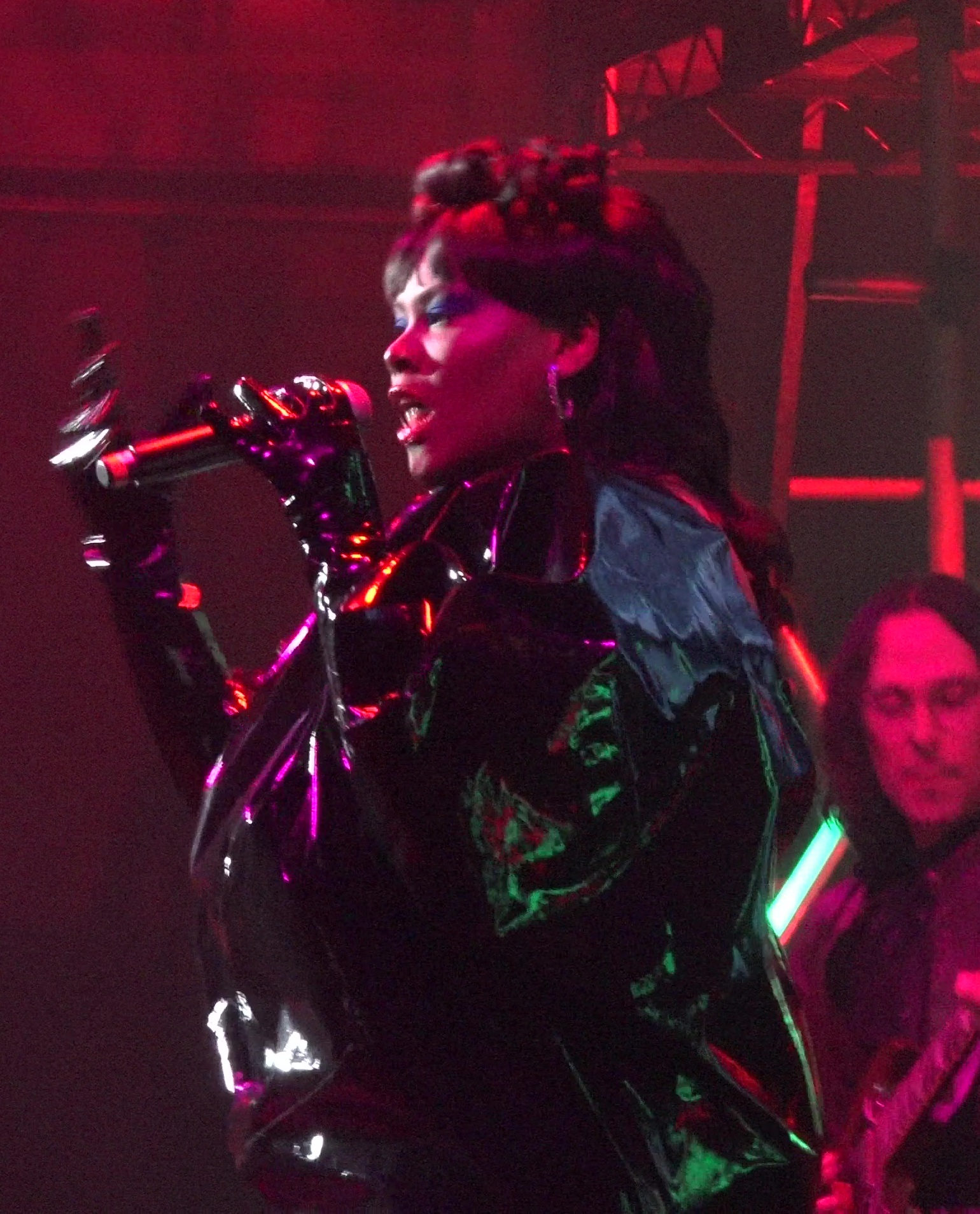
- Yseult in 2026

Background information
- Born: Yseult Marie Onguenet; 19 August 1994 (age 32); Tergnier, Picardy, France
- Genres: Alternative R&B; R&B; pop; neo soul; trap; post-punk; electro
- Occupations: Singer; songwriter; model
- Instrument: Vocals
- Years active: 2014–present
- Labels: Polydor; Y.Y.Y.

Yseult Marie Onguenet (French pronunciation: [isœlt maʁi ɔ̃ɡne], [izœlt]; born 19 August 1994), known mononymously as Yseult, is a French singer-songwriter and model. She rose to prominence after becoming the runner-up on the tenth season of Nouvelle Star, a French singing reality competition television series. She subsequently signed to Polydor Records, before releasing her debut album, Yseult, in 2015. Since leaving Polydor, she has released three extended plays as an independent artist: Rouge (2019), Noir (2019) and Brut (2020). She performed the song "My Way" for the 2024 Summer Olympics Closing Ceremony. She also worked with artists such as Christina Aguilera, Kanye West, Black Eyed Peas, Rema, Anitta, Banks, Sevdaliza, Pabllo Vittar, Shygirl, and Ty Dolla Sign.

== Life and career ==
=== 1994–2013: Early life ===
Yseult Onguenet was born on 19 August 1994, to Cameroonian parents in Tergnier, Hauts-de-France, France. She realized her talent at a young age, however, her father did not allow her to make music, prompting Onguenet to skip classes to audition for Nouvelle Star in Paris.

=== 2013–2017: Nouvelle Star and career beginnings ===
In February 2014, Yseult competed in the final of Nouvelle Star, having auditioned and made her way through the competition since the show aired in October 2013. She competed in the final against Mathieu Saikaly, the winner of the season, and performed songs such as "Roar", "Feeling Good", and "Wasting My Young Years" throughout her duration on the show.

Following the show, Onguenet signed to Polydor Records under the name Yseult, and announced that she was preparing her debut album, working with French composer and singer Emmanuel da Silva.

In May 2014, Yseult released the lead single to her album, "La Vague", the video to which she later posted on her Vevo channel. As of December 2020, the music video just had over 1 million views. Prior to the release of her album, she uploaded covers to "It's a Man's Man's Man's World" and "La Mamma" on YouTube.

On 5 January 2015, she released her debut album, titled Yseult. The album peaked at no. 69 on the French album chart, selling just 5,000 copies. The album's commercial performance was a disappointment for both Onguenet and her label, and influenced her decision to end her contract with Polydor a couple years later. Nevertheless, Yseult went on to release three videos for "Bye Bye Bye", "Pour l'impossible", and "Summer Love", all songs from her album, across 2015.

In March 2017, Yseult released her final single with the label, a cover of Blondie's "Heart of Glass". In April 2017, she worked in a writing seminar for the Black Eyed Peas, organised by Polydor, after which she decided to end her contract with the label later that year.

=== 2018–present: Rouge, Noir and other projects ===
After leaving Polydor Records, Yseult signed with IMM management. She modeled for the ASOS Autumn campaign in 2018, starring in several commercials and magazine advertorials. Yseult has since modeled for a number of campaigns, and featured on the cover of French fashion magazine Antidote in 2020.

In 2018, Yseult also established her independent label, YYY, having moved to Brussels, Belgium. The first single under her independent record label, "Rien à prouver", was released in January 2019; the song serves as the lead single to her debut extended play, Noir. The music video for "Rien à prouver" has accumulated over 1.9 million views as of December 2020.

Yseult's second extended play, Rouge, was released as a surprise project in May 2019. The record had no lead single, and was not promoted, rather Yseult described Rouge as "a project that makes a separation between the early Yseult" in the Enfnts Terribles magazine.

In 2021, French multinational L'Oréal selected Yseult as an international spokesperson for L'Oréal Paris.

In 2022, she was cast in her first acting role, playing herself in Maïmouna Doucouré's film Hawa.

In 2024, Iranian-Dutch singer Sevdaliza released the viral song "Alibi" featuring Yseult and Brazilian singer and drag queen Pabllo Vittar. On August 11, she performed "My Way" at the 2024 Summer Olympics in Paris, as the final bouquet for the closing ceremony. On September 20, she released her latest album Mental.

On 9 December 2024, Shygirl released "F*Me" featuring Yseult. The song is included in Shygirl's EP Club Shy Room 2.

In October 2025, Yseult accused R.Tee and Soyeon of plagiarizing her music video.

== Discography ==
=== Albums ===
- 2015: Yseult
- 2024: Mental
- 2026: Freak

=== EPs ===
- 2019: Noir
- 2019: Rouge
- 2020: Brut

== Filmography ==
=== Television ===
- 2021: Fugueuse by Jerome Cornuau : herself

=== Film ===
- 2022: Hawa by Maïmouna Doucouré : herself
- 2024: Saint Ex by Pablo Agüero : the singer
- 2025: Christmas in Paris by Sam Wrench : guest

=== Music videos ===
- 2025: Gorgeous by Doja Cat - herself

== Tours ==
- 2021: YTOUR
- 2025: MENTAL TOUR

== Awards and nominations ==
=== Berlin Music Video Awards ===
The Berlin Music Video Awards is an international festival that promotes the art of music videos.

Year	Nominated work	Award	Result	Ref.
2026	"FREAK"	Best Art Direction	Nominated	
