= Fathia Youssouf =

French actress (born 2006)

Fathia Youssouf Abdillahi, born on August 1, 2006, in Brest, France is a French actress.

== Biography ==
Fathia Youssouf was born on 1 August 2006 in Brest to a Djiboutian mother and a Guadeloupean father, both engineers.

It was while responding to an ad on Facebook that Fathia Youssouf was spotted by casting director Tania Arana. When she was 11, director Maïmouna Doucouré gave her the lead role in her feature film Cuties. Fathia Youssouf's first role was that of an 11-year-old girl who is ready to do anything to feel included in a group of girls. The film denounces the influence of social networks on preadolescent girls, and their early hypersexualization.

== Awards ==
- The New York Times Magazine ranked 13th best actress of the year 2020
- César Award for Most Promising Actress for Mignonnes
