= Mbissine Thérèse Diop =

Senegalese film actress

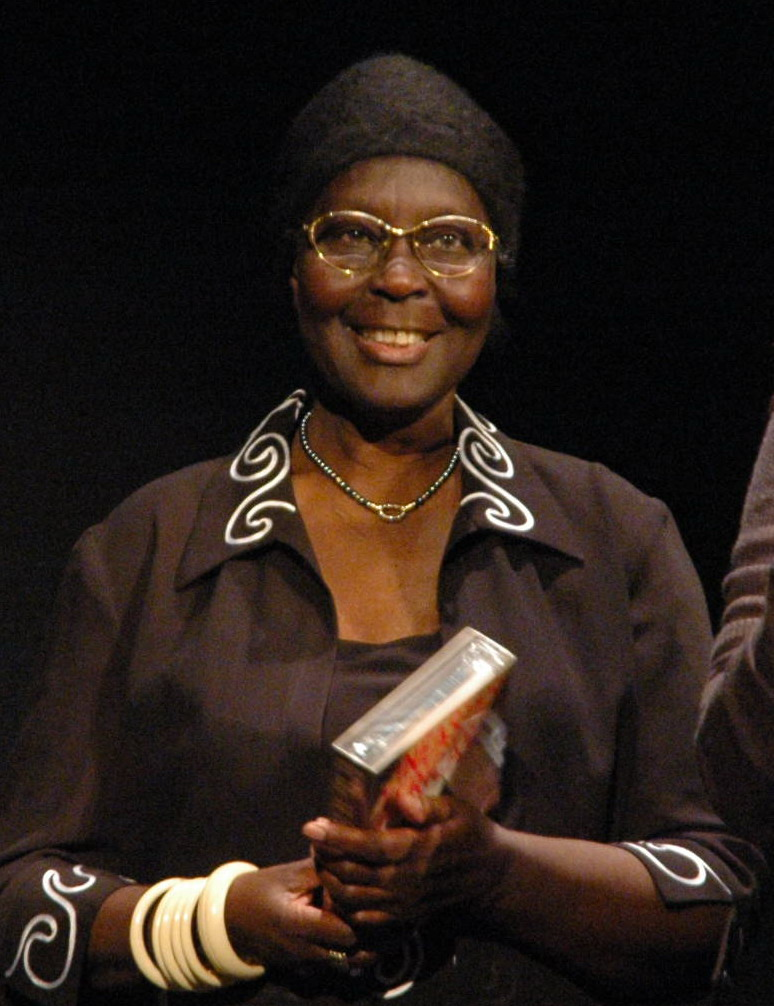
- Diop at an event in 2008
- Born: Mbissine Thérèse Diop; 1949 (age 76–77); Dakar, Senegal
- Occupations: Actress; seamstress
- Known for: Black Girl
- Notable work: Emitai

Mbissine Thérèse Diop (born 1949) is a Senegalese actress best known for her starring role as Diouana in the 1966 Ousmane Sembène film Black Girl (La noire de...), which is often cited as one of the first feature films of African cinema to go on to international acclaim.

== Early life ==
Diop was born in Dakar, Senegal to a Muslim father and a Catholic mother. The oldest in her family, Diop lived with her maternal grandfather until he died when she was two, at which time she returned to Dakar. Diop lived in Corsica when she was thirteen, where her hostess familiarised her with Josephine Baker.

== Career ==
Diop did not have an early interest in acting, but rather planned to pursue a career in textiles, specifically as a parachutist. The recommendation of a friend made Diop think more seriously about acting and the arts, and prompted Diop to reach out to Josephine Baker. After a correspondence, Baker invited Diop to visit her in France, but Diop had to decline due to cost. Diop frequented the Cine-Club in Dakar, where she was exposed to French and American films, and later enrolled at the Ecole des Arts de Dakar when she was sixteen, where she took night courses and studied under French actor Robert Fontaine (who later also starred in Black Girl). Diop worked as a seamstress during the day.

=== Black Girl ===
A photographer working at the Actualitiés Sénégalaises took a photograph of Diop which was seen by filmmaker Ousmane Sembène, who contacted Diop regarding Black Girl. Diop's family was very opposed to Diop's interest in film, but after Sembène visited with Diop she decided to accept the role. Her family and those in her neighborhood did not approve of her choice, and actively scorned her.

In The Cineaste, poet A. Van Jordan wrote of Diop's performance in Black Girl: "Diouana (Mbissine Thérèse Diop) is one of those characters you fall in love with as soon as they enter the story. Diop is one of those actors you want to stare at a couple of hours, easy. So this is an equation for emotional investment--if not unbridled infatuation, at least--woven into the writing and the casting."

=== Emitai ===
In 1971, Diop appeared in Sembène's film Emitai.

=== Later career ===
Diop still works in textiles.

In 2020, Diop appeared in the film Cuties as a community matriarch. The film has received controversy.

Diop appeared in the 2019 short documentary by Johanna Makabi Our Memory (Notre mémoire), played in the 2024 French Film Festival.
