= Hawa (2022 French film) =

- Directed by: Maïmouna Doucouré
- Written by: Maïmouna Doucouré; Alain-Michel Blanc; Zangro; David Elkaim
- Produced by: Zangro
- Starring: Sania Halifa; Oumou Sangaré; Yseult; Kamrul Hossain; Thomas Pesquet
- Cinematography: Antoine Sanier
- Edited by: Nicolas Desmaison
- Music by: Erwann Chandon; Niko Noki
- Production company: Bien Ou Bien Productions
- Distributed by: Amazon Studios
- Release dates: 13 September 2022 (TIFF); 9 December 2022 (Amazon Prime)
- Running time: 104 minutes
- Country: France
- Languages: French; Bambara

Hawa is a French drama film, directed by Maïmouna Doucouré and released in 2022. The film centres on the coming-of-age of Hawa (Sania Halifa), a teenage girl in France who is living with her grandmother (Oumou Sangaré). Fearing that social services will take her away when her grandmother falls ill, sets out to get herself adopted by former US first lady Michelle Obama. Doucouré has described the film as being about the desire to transcend one's social class.

Hawa features music from Malian Grammy-winning singer and songwriter Oumou Sangaré, as well as the French-Cameroonian singer Yseult. It premiered in the Platform Prize program at the Toronto International Film Festival on 13 September 2022, prior to its commercial distribution as an Amazon Prime Video original film. It was later announced that it would stream on Amazon Prime on 9 December 2022.

== Summary ==
Hawa is a young teenage girl living in Paris with her grandmother, Maminata, a griot who is trying to train Hawa to follow in her footsteps. Her grandmother's health is failing and she is trying to get Hawa adopted so that she will be cared for if she passes.

While working at a convenience store Hawa reads an article about Michelle Obama promoting her autobiography Becoming. She decides that since Obama's children have now graduated from school she would adopt her.

Hawa learns that her friend's father, who works as a stage technician, is helping to set up for a concert for Yseult who has been invited to attend an inclusive event held by Obama. Hawa sneaks into Yseult's stage rehearsals where the singer assumes she is a fan and, charmed by Hawa's brashness, allows her to stay for the concert and takes her with her as she is preparing for the party. Hawa steals Yseult's invitation and tries to sneak into the Obama's party. She is stopped by the police and returned home.
