= Maman(s) =

2015 French short film directed by Maïmouna Doucouré

- Film poster
- Directed by: Maïmouna Doucouré
- Produced by: Zangro
- Starring: Sokhna Diallo; Eriq Ebouaney; Maïmouna Gueye
- Production companies: Bien ou Bien Productions; France 3 National
- Release date: 26 August 2015 (Sundance)
- Running time: 20 minutes
- Country: France
- Languages: French; Wolof

Maman(s) (lit. 'Mom(s)/Mother(s)') is a 2015 French short drama film written and directed by Maïmouna Doucouré. The film stars Sokhna Diallo, Eriq Ebouaney and Maïmouna Gueye in the lead roles. The film's plot centers on Aida, an eight-year-old girl, who is adjusting to the introduction of her father's second wife. The film was inspired by director Maïmouna Doucouré's own experiences with polygamy as a young child. The film was premiered at several international film festivals including the 2015 Toronto International Film Festival, 2016 Sundance Film Festival and 2017 César Awards. The film jointly won the César Award for Best Short Film at the 42nd César Awards in February 2017 along with Alice Diop's directorial Towards Tenderness (Vers la tendresse).

== Synopsis ==
An 8-year-old girl Aïda (Sokhna Diallo) lives in an apartment with her mother Mariam (Maïmouna Gueye) in the Parisian suburb and her whole family is overwhelmed and eagerly awaiting when her father comes back from Senegal. Suddenly her father Alioune (Eriq Ebouaney) gives a stunning shock when he returns to France from Senegal with his second wife Rama (Mareme N'Diaye). The little girl Aïda and her mother are frustrated with the entrance of a woman and Aïda desperately wants to get rid of her.

== Cast ==
- Sokhna Diallo as Aïda
- Eriq Ebouaney as Alioune
- Maïmouna Gueye as Mariam
- Mareme N'Diaye as Rama
- Azize Diabaté Abdoulaye
- Maïssa Toumoutou as Bébé
- Aïda Diallo as Bintou
- Khemissa Zarouel as Nora

== Release and reception ==
Maman(s) selected and premiered in over 200 film festivals and also won around 60 awards in several international film festivals praising the screenplay of the film. The film was premiered on 26 August 2015 at the 2015 TIFF Festival and also received the Short Cuts Award for Best Short Film. The film was also screened at the Sundance Film Festival in 2016, and won the Short Film Jury Prize for International Fiction. The jury panel noted the complex nature of polygamy, and the human conflict that arises which is portrayed in the film.

In December 2016, the film was also screened at the Calcutta International Cult Film Festival in India and was nominated as one of the recipients of the Outstanding Achievement Award.

== Awards and nominations ==
Year	Award	Category	Result
2015	Leuven International Short Film Festival	Jury Award	Won
2015	Toronto International Film Festival	Best International Short Film	Won
2015	Molodist International Film Festival	Best Short Film	Nominated
2015	AFI Fest	Grand Jury Prize	Nominated
2016	Sundance Film Festival	Short Film Jury Award - International Fiction	Won
2016	Nashville Film Festival	Honorable Mention	Won
2016	Calcutta International Cult Film Festival	Outstanding Achievement Award	Nominated
2017	César Awards	Best Short Film	Won
