= Todd Field's unrealized projects =

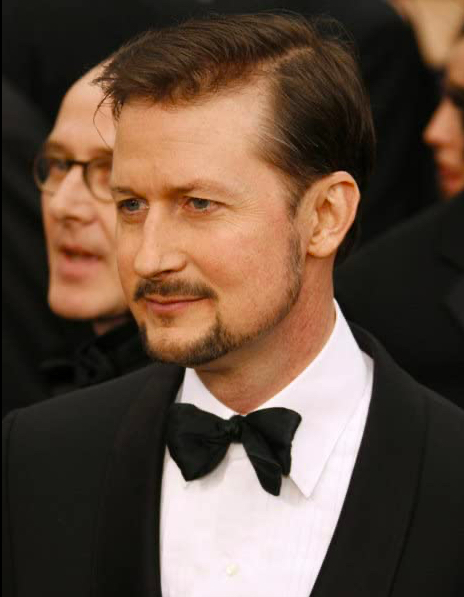
Field attending the 79th annual Academy Awards ceremony in 2007

During his long career, American filmmaker and actor Todd Field has worked on a number of projects which never progressed beyond the pre-production stage. Some of these projects fell into development hell or were officially cancelled due to circumstances that were beyond his control.

== 1990s ==
=== Untitled low-budget film ===
Prior to attending film school, Field claimed to have written a low-budget script "with Roger Corman in mind" about "a bunch of guys in the Philippines that was all talk, talk, talk, but it was terrible, because it wasn't me."

=== Untitled Andre Dubus adaptation ===
In the mid-1990s, when Field was a student at the AFI Conservatory, he hoped to adapt an unspecified story by Andre Dubus but couldn't get the rights. "As it turned out, Andre had been burned by another AFI student who had made a short film of "Killings", which is the story that In the Bedroom was ultimately based upon," Field said. "So he swore off ever giving any of his rights to anyone, though I didn't know any of this until years later." In place of the Dubus adaptation, Field made the short film Nonnie & Alex.

=== Untitled 1980s coming-of-age film ===
After graduating from AFI, Field wrote a coming-of-age story "that is fairly autobiographical about when I was about sixteen" set in the 1980s. Only the second feature script that he wrote, Field intended to send it to Stacey Snider, president of TriStar Pictures at the time, but was cautioned by his literary agent not to. "I kind of decided then that I'd probably wait until I was about fifty to make it. Because then 1980 will really feel like a period."

=== Underground ===
At one point, Field was attached to direct a script by his father-in-law Bo Goldman, Underground (alternately titled We Three), which was in development from 1993 to 2005. It is available to be read among Goldman's papers at the Academy Film Archive.

== 2000s ==
=== Revolutionary Road ===
In 2002, Field sought to direct an adaptation of the Richard Yates novel Revolutionary Road as his follow up to In the Bedroom. At the time, the rights to the novel were held by the Patrick O'Neale estate. O'Neale's widow agreed to give Field permission under the condition that he shoot from her husband's script. Field, who wanted to write it himself, respectfully declined. A film of the novel was later made in 2008, and directed by Sam Mendes, using a separate script by Justin Haythe. "That was the film I really wanted to make," said Field in 2023. "It's the ultimate [story of] dashed American dreams or the lie of the middle class in the suburbs. It's the seminal novel. It really is."

=== Time Between Trains ===
In July 2003, DreamWorks Pictures optioned the rights to Gene Smith's non-fiction book American Gothic for Field to direct, with Scott Smith tapped to write the script. Set during the Civil War period, the film was to have been a biopic of the famed stage actor Edwin Booth, brother of Lincoln assassin John Wilkes Booth:

"I kind of fell in love with this man [Edwin Booth]. He changed the way we think of drama, theater and acting. He also happened to have an incredibly tragic life. His father was a great actor who was quite a character and also very disturbed. After two years of marriage he lost the great love of his life and had to raise their child alone. He was the most famous man in America but he was also a very introverted and shy individual. And then he had this brother who was a real showboat, by all accounts not much of an actor, who ended up killing the president."

Field himself spent more than a year doing research for Time Between Trains, frequenting the Theater Collection at Harvard's Pusey Library. Speaking with the Los Angeles Times in 2007, Field revealed the story spanned five decades and five major cities, recreated in meticulous detail, requiring a massive budget. Despite production rumored to start in early 2004, after executive Michael De Luca left DreamWorks, new leadership refused to finance the expensive period epic, with Steven Spielberg delivering the news to Field that they halted further development on the film. "How can you get someone to put $50 million-$80 million on a movie that has no explosions?" Field told The Hollywood Reporter. "I can't argue with that. It was partly my own naivete saying, I can make whatever I want to make."

=== Back Roads ===
In October 2003, it was reported by Variety that Field was developing a film adaptation of Back Roads by Tawni O'Dell; producing under, and possible directing through, his production shingle Standard Film Company along with Frank Darabont and Anna Garduno's Darkwoods Productions. Ethan Gross and Paul Todisco were on board as screenwriters. Field was determined to direct the project by 2004, and was considering it as one of six possibilities to be his next film at the time.

=== The Crowded Room ===
In 2004, it was announced that Field committed to direct The Crowded Room for Fox Searchlight and New Regency. Field was to have also produced alongside Alexandra Milchan. Based on a true story of a man who was diagnosed with a multiple personality disorder, the script by Todd Graff had first been developed for director James Cameron, and then later David Fincher, Steven Soderbergh and Danny DeVito, prior to Field boarding the project.

=== Rose ===
Also in 2004, Field was reportedly developing Rose as a directing vehicle at Standard Film Company, the DreamWorks Pictures-based shingle he formed with former Stanley Kubrick collaborator Leon Vitali. Scripted by H. G. Bissenger, the project is believed to have been adapted from Bissenger's 2001 Vanity Fair article "A Darker Shade of Rose".

=== Eastside Westside ===
Another Field project in development at Standard Film Company that year was a script called Eastside Westside by What Maisie Knew screenwriters Nancy Doyne and Carroll Cartwright. In addition to directing, Field was to have produced alongside William Teitler and Charles Weinstock.

=== The Ninth Man ===
At DreamWorks, Field also planned to resurrect the WWII project The Ninth Man, based upon the 1976 novel, which Steven Spielberg had almost directed an adaptation of thirty years prior. Blake Masters and Ross Parker both worked on the script each at various times. Field's production partner Leon Vitali later addressed their obstacles in pitching the subject matter in the aftermath of the September 11 attacks when studios were looking for projects that dealt with conflict in the Middle East. "Everywhere we took it, people would say, 'Oh, there's already an Arab film out there.' The first thing we had to say was, 'No, it's not about Arabs. They're Aryan, they're not Arabs. Because Iran means 'Aryan' in case you didn't know.'"

=== Little Children TV miniseries ===
Field had originally envisioned his film Little Children as an eight-hour miniseries adaptation for HBO, that would allow him to dig further into each character's backstory. At the time Field and author Tom Perotta gave the pitch, the idea of a miniseries or a limited series was unheard of as something that would be profitable to studios; "They said, 'Nobody makes miniseries anymore. No one would ever do that. There's no such form'." Producer Scott Rudin later came in and purchased the rights to the novel, wanting to set it up as a feature film for Field to direct at New Line Cinema.

=== For God and Country ===
During the awards season for 2006's Little Children, Field told Variety that his next movie would be "an original script, but I really don't know what it's about yet because I haven't finished writing it." The following year, it was reported that Media Rights Capital was repping "the next, currently untitled film" to be written and directed by Field. Its title was later revealed as For God and Country, about a military recruiter, which both Leonardo DiCaprio and Christian Bale passed on. He was scheduled to start prep on the film the day after his youngest son was born, in March 2008, but he ultimately decided not to make it in order to stay closer to home.

=== Blood Meridian ===
As early as August 2008, Field was attached to adapt and direct Cormac McCarthy's Blood Meridian for producer Scott Rudin. A passion project for Field, he worked on the adaptation for over two years before moving on to other projects. Numerous directors had tried and failed to helm separate adaptations while Field's version remained stuck in development at Paramount Vantage, before the company's eventual collapse in 2014.

=== Buried ===
In October 2008, Field was signed on by Paramount Vantage to direct and co-produce (with Alexandra Milchan) the film Buried. Based on an article by Hillel Levin and James Keene about a couple who are forced to cope with the fallout on their relationship after they commit a crime, the screenplay by Brad Ingelsby was reported to contain elements of dark comedy.

=== The Creed of Violence ===
In 2009, Field was reported to be adapting for Universal Pictures the then-unreleased Boston Teran novel The Creed of Violence, a Western epic set in 1910. In 2011, the Los Angeles Times reported that Field was committed to directing the project as well, and that Leonardo DiCaprio was offered one of the lead roles, which had also been offered to Brad Pitt. In May 2012, Cross Creek Pictures was set to produce and finance the film, with principal photography set to commence sometime in early 2013 in the American Southwest and parts of Mexico. Field, Brian Oliver and Michael De Luca were attached as producers. In August, it was officially confirmed that Christian Bale would star in the film. In 2019, the project was again reported, this time with Daniel Craig attached to star. Production was slated to start in the spring of 2020 after Craig completed No Time to Die, and Ed Zwick was hired to direct the film after it was shelved due to the COVID-19 pandemic.

== 2010s ==
=== Hubris ===
In 2010, Deadline Hollywood reported that Bobby Moresco was writing a script titled Hubris for Field to direct at Universal. The project was later reported the following year to be a true-crime gangster revenge film based on a 2007 Playboy article titled "Boosting the Big Tuna" about the infamous murders of the men who burglarized Chicago mafia boss Tony Accardo's house in the late 1970s.

=== The White Tiger ===
It was reported that, in June 2012, Field had worked on an adaptation of Aravind Adiga's novel The White Tiger, but couldn't get it off the ground due to a legal battle with the film's India-based financier over whether or not he could make the film he wanted or if one of the backers had the right to reject the script. The project eventually wound up as a 2021 Netflix feature, albeit without Field's involvement.

=== As It Happens ===
On August 11, 2012, Field was reported to be co-writing a script called As It Happens with Joan Didion, described as a political thriller. "She kept regular hours, and there was a certain hour where pencils were down," Field later noted of working with Didion. Jennifer Fox was set to produce, and Field had met with Cate Blanchett for the lead role. However, no studio offered a worthwhile budget because the protagonist was a woman. Though this film was never made, Field and Blanchett would later reunite for 2022's Tár.

=== Hold on to Me ===
On August 15, 2012, Field was announced to be producing a Bonnie and Clyde-esque crime drama written by Brad Ingelsby called Nancy and Danny, after being originally attached to direct. In October, the title was changed to Hold on to Me. Carey Mulligan and Robert Pattinson were to star in the film, which was going to be directed by James Marsh.

=== Beautiful Ruins ===
In April 2013, Field's Standard Film Company, Cross Creek Pictures and Smuggler Films were announced to be teaming up to finance a film adaptation of Jess Walter's novel Beautiful Ruins, for Field to direct. Walter was confirmed to be co-writing the adaptation with Field. In November of that year, it was announced Imogen Poots was attached to star, with filming scheduled to begin in Italy in May 2014.

=== The Battered Bastards of Baseball adaptation ===
Field participated in the documentary The Battered Bastards of Baseball which premiered on Netflix in January 2014. Shortly thereafter, filmmaker Justin Lin acquired the rights to produce a narrative film of the story. Field, who had played for the Portland Mavericks when he was young, was in negotiations to write and direct the adaptation, with Kurt Russell in talks to participate creatively. "It would be a great movie if you could get it right," Field said. "If I were to make it, I wouldn't want to sanitize it, you know? It's not a Disney movie. There's a huge amount of heart and a lot of love that was within that team obviously, but it wasn't a polite situation."

=== Untitled Bowe Bergdahl biopic ===
On June 16, 2014, Fox Searchlight Pictures acquired the rights to make a feature film from the Rolling Stone article "America's Last Prisoner of War", about U.S. soldier Bowe Bergdahl, with Field attached to write and direct. However, the day prior, filmmaker Kathryn Bigelow had announced she was interested in directing a biopic about Bergdahl with Mark Boal writing the screenplay for Annapurna Pictures. On January 17, 2015, Bigelow's version supposedly won the duel over Field's, but she ultimately opted to make Detroit instead. Field's older son, who had been a medic in Afghanistan, had apparently "warned him away" from making a film about Bergdahl.

=== Purity TV miniseries ===
In 2016, Field worked on a planned television adaptation of the 2015 Jonathan Franzen novel Purity, which was to be a 20-hour limited series for Showtime. The series was to be co-written by Field, Franzen and playwright David Hare. It would have starred Daniel Craig as the lead and been executive produced by Field, Franzen, Craig, Hare and Scott Rudin. In 2016 Franzen said on The Diane Rehm Show that he was learning the art of adaptation from Field, whom he considered a "master" of the form. But in a February 2018 interview with The Times, Hare said that, given the budget for the adaptation ($170 million), he doubted it would ever be made. "It was one of the richest and most interesting six weeks of my life, sitting in a room with Todd Field, Jonathan Franzen and Daniel Craig bashing out the story. They're extremely interesting people", Hare added. "We wrote 2,000 pages for that series," Field told The New York Times in 2022. "What we were proposing to them was, 'Use this as a way to go through the door that is inevitable for you, into a streaming service. You need to do something that's big and has some sweep to it.' But yes, it was large and ambitious, and they didn't ultimately have the belly for it."

=== The Millers TV series ===
In April 2019, 3311 Productions announced that Field was attach to direct a series entitled The Millers, created by Devin Conroy, centering around Hall of Fame baseball broadcaster Jon Miller raising two young girls on his own.

== 2020s ==
=== Barbarian Days ===
Field was listed as co-writer of an unfilmed screenplay adapting Barbarian Days, William Finnegan's Pulitzer Prize-winning memoir about his lifelong love affair with surfing; Stephen Gaghan was attached to direct and also write the feature at Amazon Studios as of late 2020. It was categorized as an adventure/drama. Journalist Jeff Sneider reported that, in 2024, Field was supposedly in discussions with Austin Butler about starring in what would be his next film. Coincidentally, the year prior to that, Butler revealed that he had been reading Barbarian Days, hinting at his preparation for being cast in the Finnegan role.

=== The Devil in the White City TV miniseries ===
In January 2022, it was revealed that Field would direct the first two episodes of Hulu's miniseries adaptation of The Devil in the White City starring Keanu Reeves, with Leonardo DiCaprio and Martin Scorsese signed on to executive produce. Production and filming were expected to begin March 2023 in Chicago and Toronto, with the series set to launch on the streaming platform sometime in 2024. However, following Reeves departure in October of that year, Field left shortly thereafter.

=== Untitled Adam Sandler project ===
In September 2022, on Variety's Awards Circuit podcast, Field's long-time friend Adam Sandler teased that the two were discussing a potential collaboration. In December, during an episode of Happy Sad Confused, Sandler said that Field had an idea for a film that he would star in, but added that he did not know what would come of it. "Until you shoot it, you never know, but we're excited to do this cool movie together." In January 2023, Field confirmed that they were indeed planning a new film. While he remained secretive about the details or tone of the project, Field praised Sandler's performance in Punch-Drunk Love and pointed to it as an example of his dramatic range. "There's no one like him. I hope we end up working together; I really do. [...] We've been talking about some things; it's too early [to say]."

=== Untitled Maine-set film ===
In March 2023, Field was revealed to be in progress on an original script for a planned film that he wanted to set in his home state of Maine, but remained skeptical as to if he would be allowed by financiers to shoot there.

=== Home, Jack, and Gilead ===
According to Martin Scorsese, Field had assisted him in writing an adaptation of Marilynne Robinson's acclaimed novel Home, for Scorsese to direct. They finished a draft of the script with Kent Jones before the 2023 Writers Guild of America strike. In October 2023, Scorsese reported that they planned to turn Robinson's Jack into a screenplay and that, additionally, Field was eyeing to adapt Gilead as his next film.

=== The Rabbit Hutch ===
In 2026, a film version of Tess Gunty's 2022 novel The Rabbit Hutch was listed as being in pre-production with Field, David Gordon Green and Wells Tower involved as screenwriters, and Richard Brown producing. While no information was officially reported about the project at the time, the logline read: "In a sweltering week in July, low-income housing residents in a rusty Indiana town culminate in a bizarre act of violence that will change everything."

== As actor: 1989-1992 ==
=== Say Anything... ===
According to Cameron Crowe, Field was considered for the role of Lloyd Dobler in Say Anything that ultimately went to John Cusack.

=== Reservoir Dogs ===
According to Field, he auditioned for the role of Mr. Orange in Quentin Tarantino's Reservoir Dogs. "It was down to the wire between Tim Roth and me," Field said, though Roth ultimately got the part.

=== Hell Camp ===
Field also auditioned for a role in the unmade Miloš Forman film Hell Camp, set in Japan. The studio wanted someone more well known to play the role he auditioned for, suggesting John Cusack. However, since Forman preferred Field, the film was not made.
