= Martin Scorsese's unrealized projects =

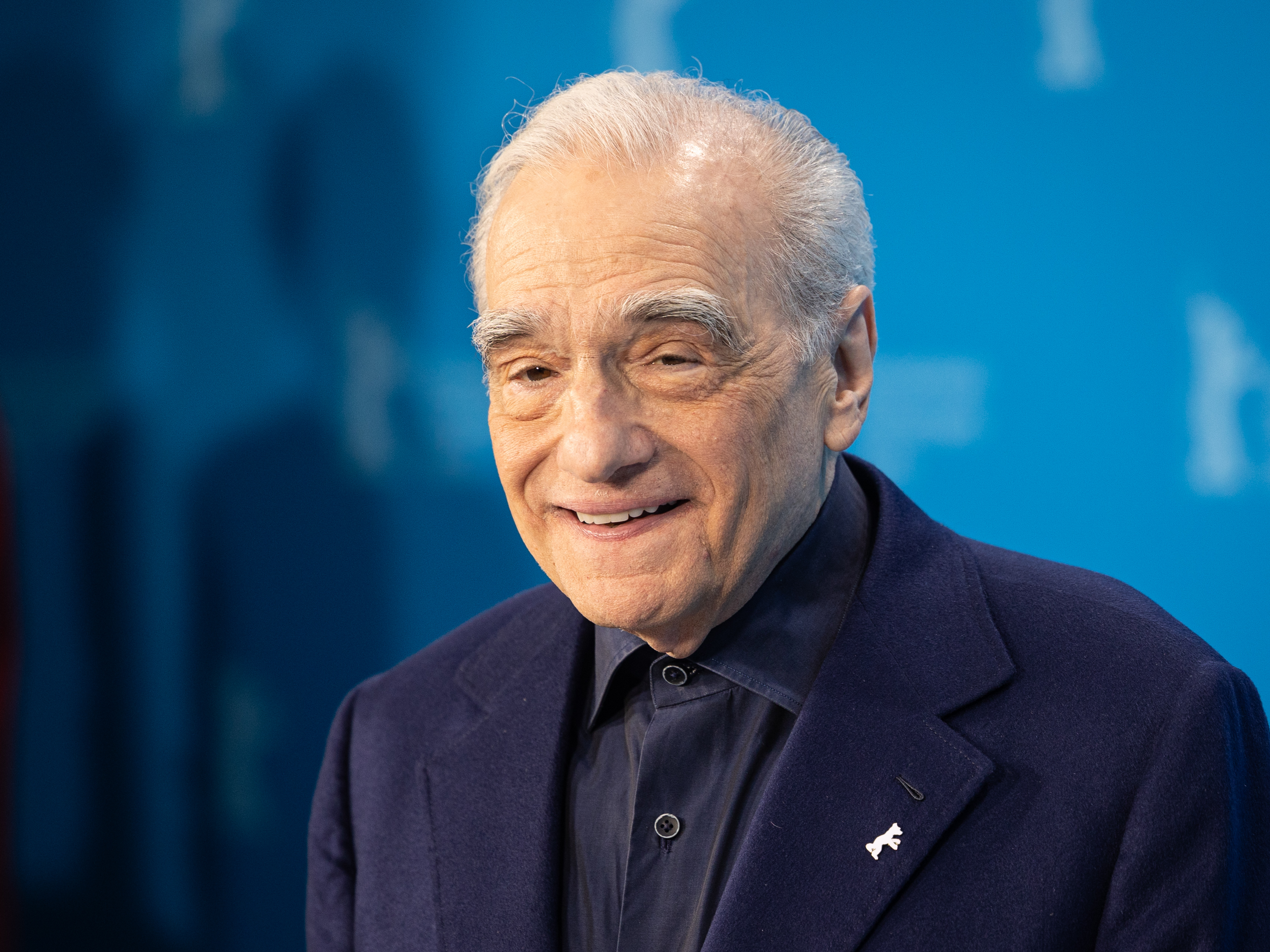
Scorsese attending the 74th annual Berlin International Film Festival in 2024

During his long career, American film director Martin Scorsese has worked on a number of projects which never progressed beyond the pre-production stage under his direction. Some of these productions fell in development hell or were cancelled.

== 1960s ==
=== Untitled Jesus in New York film ===
Scorsese said that in the early 1960s, while he was still trying to make his first feature, he had considered making a film of the gospel, but set on the Lower East Side in the tenements of contemporary Manhattan. The film was to have been shot in black-and-white with the Jesus crucifixion filmed on the West Side docks, but after Scorsese saw Pier Paolo Pasolini's The Gospel According to St. Matthew, he decided to abandon the project.

=== Jerusalem, Jerusalem ===
Scorsese originally intended for Who's That Knocking at My Door and Mean Streets to be the second and third installments in a planned "spiritual trilogy" of films that dealt with themes of crime and Catholic guilt. The first, titled Jerusalem, Jerusalem, would have starred Harvey Keitel in the role of J.R. and was centered around a seminary retreat.

=== The Honeymoon Killers ===
Scorsese was originally hired to direct The Honeymoon Killers as his second film in 1969, when it was under the working title Dear Martha, but he was fired by the film's producer early into the shoot for working too slowly. Only a few scenes he directed remain in the finished film. According to Scorsese, he attempted to craft a film in the vein of Carl Theodor Dreyer. "Instead of just making the film, I was trying to make a reputation. And I twisted and turned it in different ways stylistically. I tried to make it something it shouldn't have been," he conceded, "I was fired from that after one week, and rightly so."

=== Do Androids Dream of Electric Sheep? ===
In 1969, Scorsese and screenwriter Jay Cocks approached author Philip K. Dick about adapting his dystopian sci-fi novel Do Androids Dream of Electric Sheep? to film. Though the two never got around to optioning the rights, Dick's novel was eventually made as the film Blade Runner, in 1982.

=== Untitled war film ===
Scorsese also started work on a war film in 1969, and later stated that it "was supposed to end with the opening speech from Patton". Oliver Wood was going to be the cinematographer and it was going to be shot using 16 mm film, except for an erotic flashback using 35 mm film, using the color palette of a 1940s film. He had to wait until after Alice Doesn't Live Here Anymore to begin production, but it was cancelled two days before filming was set to begin due to financial problems.

== 1970s ==
=== Serpico ===
Scorsese almost directed Al Pacino in 1973's Serpico.

=== The Godfather Part II ===
Francis Ford Coppola first met with Scorsese about directing The Godfather sequel, impressed with his talent and not wanting to do it himself at the time. Despite campaigning to have Scorsese hired, the executives at Paramount Pictures refused to have someone other than Coppola. Scorsese later admitted that he would not have been the right choice to direct the film anyways: "I would've made something interesting, but [Coppola's] maturity was already there. I still had this kind of edgy thing, the wild kid running around."

=== The Yakuza ===
Scorsese had read the script for, and sought to direct The Yakuza, though he was not the person that screenwriter Paul Schrader had wanted. Instead, Sydney Pollack was chosen.

=== Notes from Underground ===
Scorsese was considering adapting several Fyodor Dostoevsky novels, in particularly Notes from Underground before he was offered Taxi Driver by Paul Schrader. Since the story and themes in Taxi Driver were heavily influenced by Notes from Underground, he didn't feel the need to repeat himself by making a similar film.

=== Bury My Heart at Wounded Knee ===
After the release of Taxi Driver, Scorsese was approached by actor Marlon Brando with the proposition of directing a film dramatization of the non-fiction book Bury My Heart at Wounded Knee, about the infamous Lakota Indian massacre. The adaptation never materialized.

=== Fear and Loathing in Las Vegas ===
Scorsese was interested in directing a script written by author Larry McMurtry in 1976, who had adapted Hunter S. Thompson's 1971 novel of the same name. Oliver Stone was also interested in directing the film, but both could not find producers who would back the project.

=== Haunted Summer ===
Scorsese nearly directed a film of Anne Edwards' novel Haunted Summer, about the creation of Mary Shelley's Frankenstein, and the summer she spent with poets Percy Bysshe Shelley and Lord Byron. He ultimately opted to do New York, New York instead.

=== Night Life ===
In 1978, Scorsese began working on a new script with Jay Cocks titled Night Life, which dealt with "a fraternal rivalry". However, he withdrew from the project as some of the ideas for Night Life were incorporated into Raging Bull and he was hired to direct The King of Comedy.

=== In Dreams Begin Responsibilities ===
In the late 1970s, Scorsese and Robert De Niro wanted to make a feature film out of a short story called "In Dreams Begin Responsibilities" by Delmore Schwartz, and had worked on a script briefly before switching gears to Raging Bull. Later, Scorsese toyed with the notion of adapting the story for his short film segment of New York Stories. As of 2019, he said he would still like to make the film someday.

== 1980s ==
=== Untitled Doors biopic ===
Sometime in the early 1980s, Scorsese became interested in developing and directing a film biopic centered on the Jim Morrison story, and of his band The Doors. Other directors who actively pursued this project around the same time included the likes of William Friedkin and Francis Ford Coppola, before Oliver Stone made the eventual 1991 biopic.

=== Scarface remake ===
A remake of 1932's Scarface was pursued by Scorsese and Robert De Niro as a possible director/star collaboration between them. However, Al Pacino and producer Martin Bregman were simultaneously developing their version. When De Niro found out, he cautioned Pacino to attach a director to their project or else he would play the role first.

=== Mafioso remake ===
According to Robert De Niro, he and Scorsese once mooted collaborating as star and director, respectively, on a remake of the 1962 Italian comedy Mafioso; before other projects took first priority.

=== Little Shop of Horrors ===
In 1983, producer David Geffen was initially going to team with Steven Spielberg and Scorsese for the film adaptation of the off-Broadway musical Little Shop of Horrors, to be shot in 3-D. With Scorsese at the helm and Spielberg as an executive producer, plans for this version ultimately fell through when a lawsuit was filed by the original film's screenwriter and actor, Charles B. Griffith.

=== Beverly Hills Cop ===
Scorsese admitted he turned down the offer to direct Beverly Hills Cop.

=== Witness ===
Scorsese also turned down the offer to direct Witness.

=== Gershwin ===
In 1984, Paul Schrader wrote a screenplay for a George Gershwin biopic for Scorsese to direct. In August 1993, it was reported that Scorsese was to direct a Gershwin film, with Robert De Niro and Richard Dreyfuss attached to star and the screenplay written by John Guare.

=== The Bad and the Beautiful remake ===
After development of Gershwin fell through, Scorsese and Paul Schrader began pursuing concepts for a potential remake of the 1952 film The Bad and the Beautiful, with Robert De Niro starring in the Kirk Douglas role. "It would be about our three lives: writer, director and actor," Schrader said, "So I did an outline and met [Scorsese and De Niro] both and it turned out to be very acrimonious." Schrader ultimately opted not to move forward as writer on the project following a screenwriting credit dispute with Scorsese. Scorsese, De Niro and screenwriter Eric Roth later considered an iteration of this idea to be realized in the form of a spinoff to The Irishman, but decided against it. The concept included incorporating unused footage and behind-the-scenes pieces from The Irishman.

=== Night and the City remake ===
In 1985, novelist Richard Price wrote a script for Scorsese based on the 1950 film noir Night and the City, which fellow filmmaker Bertrand Tavernier insisted he could do a great remake of. However, Scorsese was ultimately not interested in doing remakes at the time and decided to instead do The Color of Money, using Price as the writer.

=== LaBrava ===
Though Dustin Hoffman was hesitant to star in the role, he had suggested Scorsese to direct an adaptation of Elmore Leonard's novel LaBrava for producer Walter Mirisch. At the end of 1985, when Hoffman finally committed to the role of ex-Secret Service agent Joe LaBrava, the film landed at the independent Cannon Films, after being rejected by Fox, Disney and Geffen. Despite securing funding, Scorsese balked at the prospect of making a film for a company he didn't know and decided to bail. For his part, Hoffman later said that Mirisch had set up the Cannon deal without his knowledge. LaBrava was eventually scrapped, after failure to find an available replacement director.

=== Untitled Amedeo Modigliani biopic ===
In the late 1970s, actor Al Pacino commissioned Richard Price to write a screenplay based on Modigliani: A Play in Three Acts, about the tragic life of 20th-century painter Amedeo Modigliani. Pacino showed the script to various directors, with the intention being for Pacino to star as the painter. In the late 1980s, Scorsese read the screenplay and loved it, and agreed to direct, telling Empire magazine in 2019: "It was about the extraordinary struggle to create art. The sadness of it, the absinthe [...] It really would have been something special, I think." Pacino and Scorsese shopped the project around studios, but faced constant rejection.

=== The Sicilian ===
Scorsese was one of the directors who turned down the offer to direct Steve Shagan's adaptation of The Sicilian. The film would eventually be rewritten and directed by Michael Cimino.

=== Dick Tracy ===
Scorsese was approached to direct Dick Tracy before Warren Beatty wound up directing the film.

=== Schindler's List ===
In 1988, Steven Spielberg offered Scorsese the opportunity to direct Schindler's List, believing that he wasn't mature enough as a filmmaker to tackle the story. Scorsese developed it with screenwriter Steven Zaillian, but felt that Spielberg would be better to tell the story, as he was Jewish, and was still facing backlash for The Last Temptation of Christ. Spielberg similarly wanted to work on the film again, so he arranged for Scorsese to direct Cape Fear, which he had been developing, while Spielberg would return to Schindler's List.

=== Robbie Robertson and Friends documentary ===
In 1989, musician Robbie Robertson and Scorsese announced they were planning a sequel of sorts to The Last Waltz called Robbie Robertson and Friends. The project was initially going to be televised concert in collaboration with Peter Gabriel and U2, who were both unavailable at the time. Instead, Robertson expanded it into a theatrical film, explaining that it would be "a combination of The Red Shoes and All That Jazz, only dealing with music instead of dance."

== 1990s ==
=== Love in Vain ===
In 1990, Scorsese signed on to direct a screenplay for Warner Bros. based on Alan Greenberg's biography Love in Vain, about the life of blues musician Robert Johnson. The film never came to fruition because it would have taken years to make.

=== Theodora ===
Around 1990, following the critical and commercial success of Goodfellas, Scorsese pursued a film epic about Theodora's relationship with emperor Justinian I, and the founding of the Byzantine Empire. Novelist Gore Vidal was set up at Universal Pictures to write the script for Theodora, but the project never materialized. "Marty says that seven years is about right to get a picture made nowadays," said Vidal in 1994. "We're waiting on new technology, to show battle scenes without Ben-Hur prices."

=== Dirty Boulevard ===
Sometime in the early 1990s, Scorsese attempted to make a film based on the Lou Reed song "Dirty Blvd.", from his 1989 album New York. Playwright Reinaldo Povod wrote the screenplay, and had died shortly after its completion.

=== Dino ===
In 1992, Scorsese acquired the film adaptation rights to Nick Tosches's biography about Dean Martin titled Dino. Scorsese had Tom Hanks in mind to portray Martin. The ideal cast also consisted of John Travolta as Frank Sinatra, Hugh Grant as Peter Lawford, Adam Sandler as Joey Bishop and Jim Carrey as Jerry Lewis. The screenplay was written by Nicholas Pileggi. Scorsese also worked with on another script with Irwin Winkler and Paul Schrader about Martin's life during his "swinging Ocean's 11 days", before confirming in 2004 that he had given up on the project altogether.

=== High and Low remake ===
In May 1993, it was reported that Scorsese would potentially direct the American remake of the 1963 Akira Kurosawa film High and Low for Universal Pictures, with David Mamet and Richard Price writing the script. Later, in 2008, it was reported that Mike Nichols was to direct Mamet's script, with Scorsese serving as executive producer.

=== Ocean of Storms ===
In September 1993, it was reported that Scorsese had committed to directing star/producer Warren Beatty's long-in-development film Ocean of Storms. Beatty himself would have starred as an aging astronaut who returns to the space program after many years to recapture his former glory. The original script was written by Tony Bill and Ben Young Mason, with subsequent multiple revisions.

=== Clockers ===
The film version of Richard Price's novel Clockers originally entered production with Scorsese attached to direct, having previously collaborated with author Price on his 1986 film The Color of Money. Scorsese eventually dropped out of production to focus on his passion project Casino, at which point Spike Lee stepped in to direct and rewrite the script. Scorsese remained a co-producer alongside Lee.

=== Untitled Walter Winchell biopic ===
In 1994, Scorsese became attached to direct a new film on the gossip columnist and radio commentator Walter Winchell. The script was written by Steve Zaillian, adapted from the biography Winchell: Gossip, Power and the Culture of Celebrity by Neal Gabler. Dustin Hoffman and Tom Hanks were both, at different points, set to portray Winchell. Scorsese had considered making the film at various stages; following Kundun, Bringing Out the Dead, and Gangs of New York.

=== Live ===
In 1995, following the publication and reception of Richard Pryor's autobiography Pryor Convictions: And Other Life Sentences, Scorsese started developing a film based on the book as a potential directing project. Damon Wayans was cast as the comedian, with Pryor himself and his wife Jennifer Lee consulting and Robert O'Hara writing the script. Filming was supposed to begin in late 1996 or early 1997, with the working title of Live, but the project was held up due to Scorsese's indecisiveness.

=== Analyze This ===
Robert De Niro had apparently wanted Scorsese to direct Analyze This but he turned it down: "We already did it. It was Goodfellas," he told De Niro.

=== The Old Blue Eyes ===
External videos
- Martin Scorsese's FRANK SINATRA Movie - Unmade Biopics on YouTube (45:14)

In 1999, development began on a decade-spanning project Scorsese was attached to direct, initially with John Travolta and Tom Hanks both lined up to star as Frank Sinatra and Dean Martin, respectively. "Marty just can't get the script he wants," Travolta told the Ottawa Sun at the time, "otherwise we're all there." This was originally meant to be a biopic of the Rat Pack group, but ended up morphing into a film solely about Sinatra. Throughout the 2000s, the project was further developed, with Leonardo DiCaprio eventually landing the role of the singer in 2009, replacing Travolta. Johnny Depp and George Clooney were additionally mentioned as possibilities for the role at this time as well. However, in an interview in 2010, Scorsese stated "my choice is Al Pacino, and Robert De Niro as Dean Martin," after previously hinting that Sinatra might be played by more than one actor. He later considered casting an unknown for the Sinatra role. The project fell apart when an agreement could not be reached with the Sinatra estate. Phil Alden Robinson was set to write the script, though Billy Ray and Michael Chabon were later attached at different stages. The 1966 Esquire profile "Frank Sinatra Has a Cold" was used as the basis for the story. In 2011, Scott Rudin joined the project as producer. In 2012, Scorsese was said to be considering the possibility of shooting Sinatra in 3D. In 2017, Scorsese was quoted as saying "I think it is finally over. They won't agree to it. Open it up again and I'm there!" In 2024, Variety reported that Scorsese was returning to the feature and planning to shoot it back-to-back with A Life of Jesus. DiCaprio was still attached to star, with Jennifer Lawrence set to portray Ava Gardner. Soon after the announcement, Nancy Sinatra reposted a social media disapproval over the casting of both leads. By mid-August 2024, the film's November start date was cancelled. Rodrigo Prieto was expected to serve as cinematographer on this version. This iteration was allegedly given the title of The Old Blue Eyes, after a nickname attributed to Sinatra.

=== Perfume: The Story of a Murderer ===
Following Stanley Kubrick's death in 1999, the film rights to Patrick Süskind's 1981 novel Perfume: The Story of a Murderer became available, and Scorsese was one of several directors interested in attaching himself to a potential adaptation of the story. A version was later produced in 2006, directed by Tom Tykwer.

== 2000s ==
=== Tokyo Underworld TV series ===
In March 2000, it was reported that Scorsese and Nicholas Pileggi would reunite for a feature film adaptation of Robert Whiting's Pantheon post-war set book Tokyo Underworld. which was optioned by DreamWorks Pictures. At this time, Scorsese was eyeing the project as a potential next directing vehicle. Jason Cahill was selected to co-write the script with Pileggi, who was to also executive produce alongside Scorsese. According to Paul Schrader, around 2009, he and Scorsese later developed Tokyo Underworld as crime series for HBO.

=== Gucci: A House Divided ===
In August 2000, Scorsese was on board to direct Gucci: A House Divided, described as a "sprawling epic tracking four generations of the Italian fashion dynasty" based on the 1987 book of the same title by Gerald McKnight. The project was being developed by Michael Ovitz' Artists Production Group.

=== Into the Setting Sun ===
In September 2000, Variety reported that Scorsese agreed to direct Into the Setting Sun, a film depicting the construction of the first Transcontinental Railroad, to be produced by Steven Spielberg through DreamWorks in a co-financing deal with Warner Bros. William Wittliff was assigned to write the script.

=== Alexander ===
In 2001, Leonardo DiCaprio was attached to a biopic of Alexander the Great, with Scorsese to direct a screenplay by Christopher McQuarrie and Peter Buchman. DiCaprio later joined Baz Luhrmann's rival production based on Alexander, though this version never came to fruition either. Ultimately, Oliver Stone's Alexander, starring Colin Farrell, was released in 2004.

=== Nostromo ===
In April 2002, it was reported that Scorsese was in negotiations with the David Lean Foundation to take on the late director's final film, an unfinished adaptation of Joseph Conrad's novel Nostromo. As of the announcement, Marlon Brando and Sean Penn were said to be interested in the project, which had a provisional budget of £30 million.

=== Winter's Tale ===
Around 2002, Warner Bros. attempted to sign Scorsese to direct an adaptation of Winter's Tale initially, but he turned down the job, calling Mark Helprin's novel "unfilmable."

=== St. Agnes' Stand ===
In April 2003, DreamWorks Pictures optioned Thomas Eidson's Western epic St. Agnes' Stand for Scorsese to direct. Set in the 1860s, the novel follows a nun and a group of children who are rescued from a savage group of Apache Indians. Charles Randolph would have written the script.

=== Hyperion ===
Author Dan Simmons revealed at the University Book Store in 2003 that he had sold the movie rights to his Hyperion novel series to a major studio, claiming that Scorsese was interested in directing, with Leonardo DiCaprio as one of the main characters.

=== The Heart of the Matter ===
In early 2004, Scorsese was developing an adaptation of Graham Greene's The Heart of the Matter as a potential directing vehicle, with Don Macpherson scripting. Scorsese reportedly read Greene's 1948 novel "as a young man and never forgot it." The film was to have been bankrolled through StudioCanal.

=== The Darling ===
Following their work on The Aviator in 2004, Scorsese was set to direct Cate Blanchett in an adaptation of the Russell Banks novel The Darling. In 2012, Denis Villeneuve was set to direct the feature with Jessica Chastain starring.

=== Taxi Driver sequel ===
In January 2005, Robert De Niro spoke of a possible sequel to Taxi Driver, featuring an older Travis Bickle, and that the project was being discussed between him and Scorsese. In November 2013, De Niro revealed that original writer Paul Schrader had written a first draft, but that both he and Scorsese thought it was not good enough to proceed.

=== Drunken Angel remake ===
In February 2005, The Hollywood Reporter announced that Scorsese, Leonardo DiCaprio and screenwriter John Logan were in early negotiations to develop a remake of Akira Kurosawa's 1948 classic Drunken Angel for Warner Bros.

=== Roosevelt ===
In September 2005, Scorsese was developing a biopic at Paramount Pictures based on Edmund Morris' book The Rise of Theodore Roosevelt, with Leonardo DiCaprio favored to star in the role of U.S. president Theodore Roosevelt. At that time, Nicholas Meyer was attached as writer, and the film was scheduled to begin shooting as early as 2008. In September 2017, the biopic Roosevelt was again revived with Scorsese directing and DiCaprio starring. Scott Bloom was to have written the script for the drama.

=== Frankie Machine ===
In the mid-2000s, after reading the novel The Winter of Frankie Machine by Don Winslow, Robert De Niro expressed interest in starring in a film adaptation. Scorsese considered taking on the project at one point, with Paramount Pictures CEO Brad Grey ready to green-light the film. Brian Koppelman and David Levien were set to script the project. However, Scorsese and De Niro decided they wanted to adapt I Heard You Paint Houses by Charles Brandt, a book De Niro came across while preparing for his role, into a film instead (which would later become The Irishman).

=== The Departed sequel ===
Scorsese was offered by Warner Bros. to direct a sequel to his film The Departed. "What they wanted was a franchise," Scorsese later reflecting. "It wasn't about a moral issue of a person living or dying [...] They wanted the franchise. Which means: I can't work here anymore."

=== The Last Duel ===
In December 2006, Scorsese sought to develop and possibly direct a film of the historical novel The Last Duel: A True Story of Crime, Scandal, and Trial by Combat in Medieval France through his four-year first-look deal at Paramount Pictures. Ridley Scott would later direct the adaptation, released in 2021.

=== The Long Play ===
On February 27, 2007, it was reported that Paramount Pictures would be moving forward with The Long Play, a rock 'n roll epic to be directed by Scorsese. William Monahan was set to rewrite the script for the film based on an idea by Mick Jagger which follows two friends through 40 years in the music industry, from the early days of R&B to contemporary hip-hop. Both Rich Cohen and Matthew Weiss did exhaustive research for the project and wrote several drafts.

=== The Fighter ===
Star Mark Wahlberg offered Scorsese the script for The Fighter, who turned it down, finding the film's Massachusetts setting redundant after having finished The Departed. Wahlberg later cited Scorsese's own Raging Bull as an influence for The Fighter, which would be directed by David O. Russell.

=== Marley documentary ===
In 2008, Scorsese was set to direct a documentary on the musician Bob Marley.

=== Untitled John Martorano biopic ===
In 2008, The Boston Herald claimed that Scorsese had met with John Martorano, and had gotten Graham King to secure the rights to his life story, with William Monahan writing a script.

== 2010s ==
=== Furious Love ===
In June 2011, Paramount Pictures was finalizing a deal to develop a film as a directing vehicle for Scorsese about the Hollywood romance between actors Elizabeth Taylor and Richard Burton, based on the book Furious Love, by Sam Kashner and Nancy Schoenberger. The film was to have been produced by Julie Yorn, Gary Foster and Russ Krasnoff of Krasnoff Foster Productions, and Scorsese through Sikelia.

=== The Gambler ===
In August 2011, Scorsese had been set up to direct Leonardo DiCaprio in The Gambler, a remake of the 1974 film, itself loosely adapted from the short novel by Fyodor Dostoevsky. William Monahan, who had written Scorsese's The Departed which also starred DiCaprio, was set to write the adaptation for Paramount Pictures. Scorsese and DiCaprio both left the project the following year, though Monahan's draft remained in the finished product.

=== The Snowman ===
In November 2011, Scorsese was set to direct The Snowman, with a script by Matthew Michael Carnahan. He later dropped out of the project.

=== Untitled Bill Clinton documentary ===
In 2012, Scorsese announced he was making a documentary on ex-U.S. president Bill Clinton. The film was partially shot, but was shelved at the beginning of 2015 when Clinton was said to have asked for too much creative control over how he was portrayed. Scorsese has said the film could still be made someday.

=== Gangs of New York TV series ===
In 2013, a potential TV series based on Scorsese's film Gangs of New York was reported to be in the works from Miramax Television and GK Films. The series would have drawn from the events of the 2002 film and chronicle the birth of organized crime in America, taking place in New York, Chicago and New Orleans at the turn of the 20th century. In 2022, Scorsese was set to executive produce and direct the first two episodes of the series after reading Brett C. Leonard's script, which was then reported to be a new take on the story that features different characters entirely.

=== Blood Meridian ===
In a 2014 essay for Vice, actor James Franco addressed that Scorsese had tried in vain, and failed to adapt the Cormac McCarthy novel Blood Meridian into a feature film.

=== Ashecliffe TV pilot ===
On August 25, 2014, Scorsese was set to direct a television pilot for the series Ashecliffe, from a script by Dennis Lehane. It would have been a spinoff of Shutter Island taking place on the eponymous prison.

=== Untitled Ramones biopic ===
On August 28, 2014, Scorsese announced he'd direct a biopic about the punk rock band the Ramones.

=== Cortes TV series ===
In November 2014, Scorsese was reported to be directing a television series for HBO based on the life of Hernán Cortés, which would have been written by Chris Gerolmo, and executive produced by Scorsese, Gerolmo, and Benicio del Toro, who was interested in starring.

=== Cleopatra ===
In December 2014, information leaked regarding Scorsese's negotiations to direct Angelina Jolie's long-in-development Cleopatra film, for Sony Pictures. Roles were floated for Daniel Day-Lewis and Leonardo DiCaprio. Francesca Scorsese later remembered that he was going to make the film, to which Scorsese reacted: "We were gonna do Cleopatra at one point. And then they made fun of Kim Jong [Un]," referring to the political satire The Interview. "Seth Rogen, right? And then [Kim] got mad and he ruined Cleopatra; we were gonna do it. Eric Roth—we were ready on the script—[and] Angelina Jolie; we were goin'. And she [was] Cleopatra VII, it was gonna be really wild. [...] tell Seth, because they ruined everything. Just because Kim Jong Un didn't have a sense of humor".

=== Untitled Mike Tyson biopic ===
On March 13, 2015, Jamie Foxx announced that Scorsese would direct him in a Mike Tyson biopic, with a script by Terence Winter. Scorsese's version was still being worked on as of 2017, but was later redeveloped into a miniseries for Antoine Fuqua to direct.

=== Untitled Macbeth documentary ===
On March 20, 2015, actor/director Kenneth Branagh told Kermode and Mayo's Film Review that his acclaimed 2013 stage production of Shakespeare's Macbeth was in the process of being made into a Scorsese-directed film version. The following month, in May, it was reported that Scorsese hoped to film a documentary about Branagh's production by reuniting the original cast and filming performances over the course of a few weeks in Leavesden.

=== The Devil in the White City ===
In August 2015, Scorsese signed on to direct an adaptation of The Devil in the White City for Paramount Pictures, with Billy Ray to write the script and Leonardo DiCaprio set to star as H. H. Holmes. It was later redeveloped as a miniseries for the streamer Hulu, starring Keanu Reeves, to be executive produced by Scorsese and DiCaprio, written by Sam Shaw, and directed by Todd Field. As of 2023, it was no longer being developed at Hulu, and was being shopped to other streamers. In 2025, the project was revived back into a film at 20th Century Studios, with Scorsese and DiCaprio entering negotiations as director and star, respectively.

=== Maestro ===
In October 2015, Scorsese was attached as the initial director of the Leonard Bernstein biopic Maestro, which was set up at Paramount Pictures. He stepped down to work on The Irishman, allowing Bradley Cooper to join the film in May 2018 as director and to star as Bernstein. Scorsese produced the film alongside Steven Spielberg.

=== The General ===
In 2016, Scorsese was reported to be in talks to direct a biopic of George Washington, from a script by Bill Collage and Adam Cooper.

=== Hustlers ===
In early 2017, Lorene Scafaria's screenplay for Hustlers and a sizzle reel were sent to Scorsese and Adam McKay, the latter remained as a producer with interest of directing. Both passed and Scarfaria eventually directed the film herself.

=== The Caesars TV series ===
In February 2018, it was reported that Michael Hirst would collaborate with Scorsese for a television drama series which would tell the story of the early rulers of ancient Rome, starting with the rise to power of Julius Caesar. Titled The Caesars, a pilot episode had been written, with an outline for the rest of the season. Filming was expected to commence the following year in Italy.

=== An Afternoon with SCTV documentary ===
In April 2018, Netflix announced Scorsese would direct a special reuniting the cast of Second City Television. A reunion moderated by Jimmy Kimmel was filmed in Toronto the following month. In May 2021, SCTV cast member Joe Flaherty said on social media that the special had been shelved, which Netflix initially denied. In October 2026, Kimmel confirmed Scorsese had abandoned the project several years before; with new director Jason Hehir, Kimmel completed the special under the title SCTV: The Greatest Show You've Never Heard Of, using new reunion footage filmed in 2025.

=== Heaven and Hell ===
After Bernardo Bertolucci's death in November 2018, Scorsese showed interest in directing one of his unfilmed projects—Heaven and Hell, a biography of the murderous composer Carlo Gesualdo written by Mark Peploe—but was sidetracked by his own projects.

== 2020s ==
=== The Apostles and Apocrypha TV miniseries ===
In April 2021, Paul Schrader revealed in an interview for The New Yorker that he and Scorsese were at that time planning a three-year series about the origins of Christianity, to be titled The Apostles and Apocrypha.

=== The Grateful Dead ===
In November 2021, Scorsese was set to direct and produce a biopic feature about rock band the Grateful Dead for Apple Studios featuring Jonah Hill as Jerry Garcia. Scott Alexander and Larry Karaszewski were reported to be collaborating on the script for the biopic with Rick Yorn.

=== The Wager ===
In 2022, it was announced Scorsese would direct an adaptation of David Grann's non-fiction novel The Wager: A Tale of Shipwreck, Mutiny and Murder for Apple Studios, reteaming once again with Leonardo DiCaprio. This would have been the pair's next film following Killers of the Flower Moon. In 2023, Scorsese expressed hesitancy about the conditions of shooting on the water, which, according to him, might necessitate a co-director.

=== A Life of Jesus ===
In May 2023, after meeting with Pope Francis, Scorsese said he was inspired to write and direct a new film about Jesus. Later that year, in September, Scorsese elaborated that it would feature staged scenes and not follow a straight narrative structure. He also said that he himself would appear in the film. Speaking in an interview with the Los Angeles Times in 2024, Scorsese reaffirmed his intention to make the film after having completed the screenplay with critic and filmmaker Kent Jones, which they based on Shūsaku Endō's book A Life of Jesus. He envisioned it having a runtime of 80 minutes with a "partially modern day, partially ancient" setting, and planned to begin shooting in late April. By April, Andrew Garfield and Miles Teller were eyed to join the film in undisclosed roles, with the start date for production then moved to later that year in Israel, Egypt and Italy. However, in September it was reported that these plans had been cancelled.

=== Home ===
In September 2023, Scorsese made it known that he had several more film projects he wanted to make, among them an adaptation of Marilynne Robinson's Home. He first began working on the script with filmmaker Todd Field, and later Kent Jones, prior to the WGA strike. By November 2024, Home was still "a very strong possibility" to be Scorsese's next film, but was being held up by a scheduling issue. In March 2025, Publishers Weekly confirmed that Apple Original Films was developing the film with Leonardo DiCaprio attached to star, as well as Field's involvement as co-writer/producer of the film. It was indicated that DiCaprio stepped down from starring in Damien Chazelle's planned biopic Evel Knievel on Tour in 2025, and prioritized a Scorsese collaboration due to the director's old age. Despite this, plans for a production shoot that summer were not reached.

=== Jack ===
In October 2023, Scorsese disclosed that he, Todd Field and Kent Jones also intended to adapt Robinson's Jack into a screenplay after the strike ended.

=== Untitled limited series ===
In August 2024, at a Q&A event Scorsese mentioned he was considering developing a limited-run series as one of his next projects, and that he wanted to direct it straight through unlike the HBO shows Boardwalk Empire and Vinyl in which he only helmed the pilot episodes.

=== Untitled semi-autobiographical film ===
In a November 2024 interview with Associated Press, Scorsese suggested that "a possibility" for his next film would be one inspired by his own family history and how his parents grew up as Sicilian immigrants.

=== Untitled Wilford Pulawa biopic ===
In February 2025, it was announced that Scorsese would direct and co-produce a crime drama film based on an untold true story—described as being in the same vein as The Departed and Goodfellas—which would star Dwayne Johnson, Leonardo DiCaprio and Emily Blunt. Johnson and Blunt brought the story to Scorsese, which is set in 1960s and '70s Hawaii and follows a real-life mob boss who fought rival crime factions for control of the underworld of the Hawaiian islands. Journalist and documentary filmmaker Nick Bilton was hired to write the screenplay. The following month, Walt Disney Studios, under its 20th Century Studios division, acquired rights to the film. It was then revealed Johnson would co-write the script with Bilton, and that the two were additionally collaborating on a nonfiction book which the film would adapt. "This isn't just a gangster story – it's about power, identity, and what was taken from the Hawaiian people," Johnson explained in a statement. He and Bilton were said to have acquired a trove of documents on Wilford "Nappy" Pulawa, who led the syndicate known as The Company. By May 2026, a report from Puck News confirmed the project was still in active development at 20th Century and awaiting the greenlight from Disney, with Bilton expected to turn in a major script revision within a month. Less than two weeks later, an insider claimed "Marty wanted it to be more voice-over-y, more Goodfellas" and that "those were the marching orders Nick was given, and he spent the last four months implementing the notes". Conflicting details arose about the start of production, with one rumor stating that principal photography would begin as early as October that year. However, sources told Page Six Hollywood that it was not likely to begin filming until 2027 — or even later, depending on the latest draft.

=== Midnight Vendetta ===
In May 2025, a finished script tentatively titled Midnight Vendetta was submitted by Eric Roth, with Scorsese and Leonardo DiCaprio said to be respectively attached as director and star. The project was to tackle the Mafia's arrival in New Orleans in around 1890, which marked the first major foothold of organized Italian crime in America. By April the following year, casting grids began appearing for Midnight Vendetta that indicated a December production start in New Orleans, and thus would have marked Scorsese's second shoot of 2026 after What Happens at Night.

== Producer only ==
=== Insomnia ===
In 1988, it was reported that Scorsese, Jonathan Taplin and Nick Wechsler would executive produce Insomnia, a film telling the story of Robbie Robertson, to be directed by David Fincher and written by Steve De Jarnett. The story was later told by Robertson as a memoir, published posthumously in 2025.

=== Untitled Federico Fellini documentary ===
In the early 1990s, Scorsese was going to collaborate with Federico Fellini on a potential documentary about film production. The project was set up at Universal, with Scorsese set to executive produce, however it was never made following Fellini's death in 1993. "He had a series of scripts on how a production is made," Scorsese recalled of their project in 2018. "One, you have the production itself. Then you have the actor, then you have the cinematographer. He was going to make a Fellini film on each one."

=== The Chair vs. Ruth Snyder ===
Also in the early 1990s, Scorsese and Jonathan Demme were involved to co-produce what would have been Samuel Fuller's final directorial project, entitled The Chair vs. Ruth Snyder, the story of the first woman executed in the United States.

=== Cool Heaven ===
In 1993, actress Margot Kidder was set to make her directorial debut with the film Cool Heaven for producer Michael Nolin, with Scorsese reportedly "godfathering" the project.

=== Bedlam remake ===
In 1994, a remake of the 1946 film Bedlam was in development with Scorsese attached as a producer.

=== Wild Strawberries remake ===
In 1995, it was reported that Scorsese would produce an American remake written and directed by Bo Goldman of Ingmar Bergman's Wild Strawberries, with Gregory Peck starring.

=== Untitled Martha Mitchell biopic ===
In January 1996, Scorsese and his ex-wife Barbara De Fina explored working on a biopic on Watergate scandal whistleblower Martha Mitchell, written by and starring Diane Ladd.

=== Rent ===
In August 1996, a film adaptation of Jonathan Larson's musical Rent was in development with Scorsese set as a producer.

=== Mephisto's Bridge ===
In 1997, it was indicated by the LA Times that Scorsese would executive produce the gothic horror film Mephisto's Bridge, set to be directed by Guillermo del Toro through Phoenix Pictures. The story reportedly follows "a gifted billboard designer, the girl he desires and his dark pact with a supernatural being."

=== Untitled John Woo film ===
In a 2010 interview with Variety, Hong Kong director John Woo revealed that he was going to direct a film about "young kids running wild in Brooklyn" with Scorsese serving as producer.

=== Xtreme City ===
Scorsese was going to produce a teaming of Leonardo DiCaprio and Shah Rukh Khan for a gangster film called Xtreme City, which was going to be directed by Paul Schrader. At the Berlin Film Festival in 2011, he and Schrader met with the two actors, though Khan was allegedly hesitant about starring in a Hollywood English-speaking film, so he declined.

=== Silver Ghost ===
In 2012, Scorsese announced that he would produce Silver Ghost, a film that explored the origin of Rolls-Royce cars.

=== 60 Seconds of Us ===
In 2012, Scorsese was reported as being attached to 60 Seconds of Us, a film by Bahman Ghobadi set in New York.

=== Joker ===
It was reported in the 2010s that Scorsese was to produce Joker with Leonardo DiCaprio playing the titular character. He later left the project to focus on The Irishman.

=== Untitled Byron Janis biopic ===
In 2016, Scorsese was reported as attached to a biopic based on the life of classical pianist Byron Janis.

=== Bastard ===
Rodrigo Prieto, the cinematographer for Silence, intended for his directorial debut to be Bastard. The script was written by Bill Gullo and Scorsese was an executive producer. Filming was meant to start in the first quarter of 2018.

=== King Leopold's Ghost ===
On November 21, 2019, it was announced that Ben Affleck would direct a film adaptation of Adam Hochschild's 1998 book King Leopold's Ghost, about the plundering and atrocities committed in the Congo Free State under King Leopold II of Belgium, with Farhad Safinia writing the screenplay. Scorsese and Emma Tillinger Koskoff were set to produce the film through Sikelia Productions alongside Affleck's Pearl Street Films and Harry Belafonte and Gina Belafonte.

=== Another Turn of the Screw ===
In 2020, Scorsese's name was linked to the production of Another Turn of the Screw, the story of a young woman who becomes the assistant to novelist Henry James. He was attached as executive producer alongside Daniel Christophersen and the film's directors, Philip Horne and Simon Johnson. The cast consisted of Emily Barber as Theodora Bosanquet, Stanley Townsend as Henry James, Geoffrey Streatfeild as Colonel Betteridge, Melanie Jessop as Mary Petherbridge, and Jasmine McIvor as Alice. It was never filmed.

=== Fascinating Rhythm ===
In 2021, Scorsese was announced to produce Fascinating Rhythm, a musical drama inspired by the works of George Gershwin.

=== The Memory Police ===
In January 2024, Scorsese was set to executive produce a film adaptation of Yōko Ogawa's novel The Memory Police.

=== Wall of White ===
In 2025, Deadline reported that Scorsese was attached as producer of the survival tale Wall of White.

== See also ==
- Martin Scorsese filmography
- Goncharov - Internet meme about a fictional Scorsese film that originated on Tumblr in the early 2020s.

== Works cited ==
- Wilson, Michael (2011). Scorsese On Scorsese. Cahiers du Cinéma. ISBN 9782866427023.
