= Transparent eyeball =

Emerson's philosophical approach to perceiving nature

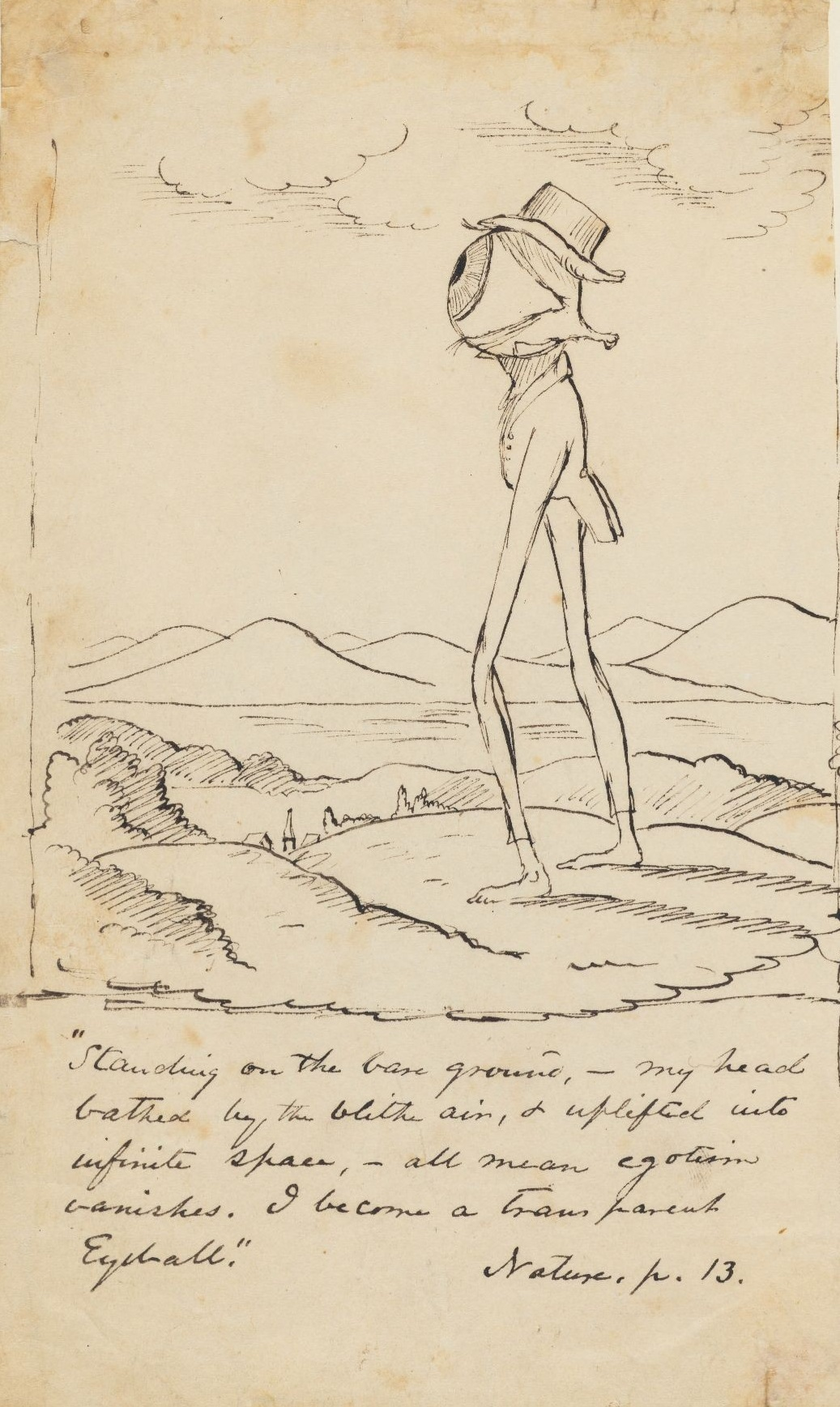
"Transparent eyeball" as illustrated by Christopher Pearse Cranch, ca. 1836-1838

The transparent eyeball is a philosophical metaphor originated by American transcendentalist philosopher Ralph Waldo Emerson. In his essay Nature, the metaphor stands for a view of life that is absorbent rather than reflective, and therefore takes in all that nature has to offer without bias or contradiction. Emerson intends that the individual become one with nature, and the manner of the transparent eyeball is an approach to achieving it.

== Overview ==
In Nature, alongside many viewpoints he considers, Emerson describes nature as the closest experience there is to experiencing the presence of God. To truly appreciate nature, one must not only look at it and admire it, but also be able to feel it taking over the senses without biases or contradictions. This process requires absolute solitude, as he notes that "a man needs to retire as much from his chamber as from society" to uninhabited places like the woods where—

[...] we return to reason and faith. There I feel that nothing can befall me in life, — no disgrace, no calamity, (leaving me my eyes,) which nature cannot repair. Standing on the bare ground, — my head bathed by the blithe air, and uplifted into infinite spaces, — all mean egotism vanishes. I become a transparent eye-ball; I am nothing; I see all; the currents of the Universal Being circulate through me; I am part or particle of God.

According to Emerson, for most people, seeing is a superficial act. It is light illuminating the eye revealing what is physically evident, as opposed to how the Sun "shine[s] into the eye and heart of the child." Emerson's argument is that outer and inner vision merge to reveal perceived symbolic connections, making the natural world into a personal landscape of freedom. Going further than this finite perception of freedom, the transparent eyeball merges with what it sees, thus making this unity immediate, especially between the self and God, losing grip of the biases and contradictions that the self previously made when within nature.

== Origin ==
Emerson attended Harvard Divinity School in 1825— and by 1826, had applied for a license to preach at the Middlesex Association of Ministers. By 1832, Emerson left the Christian ministry but continued to believe in God. However, he held that God reveals his grandeur not only in scripture, but also through nature. "Emerson's reading in science soon after leaving the ministry was his effort to interpret God's natural book. As Emerson became increasingly interested in science, he eventually came to believe nature, not scripture, was the locus of revelation. His desire to become a naturalist was intimately connected to his yearning to write a new bible of God's revelation in nature."

Some scholars believe that the "transparent eyeball" passage is an echo of the Bible. 'In Nature, Emerson fashions himself as a new prophet of nature, believing with Goethe that "prophetic vision" arises only in "slowpaced experiment." Vision arises from observing nature, where, as he writes in Nature, "All things are moral; and in their boundless changes have an unceasing reference to spiritual nature." The essay can be regarded as Emerson's attempt to make nature itself a bible. In this sense, one need not spend Sundays at church but can simply retreat to the 'woods' and let nature inhabit one's consciousness. "The reconstruction of religion in Emerson's nature works in a number of directions. First, there is an undeniable romantic-naturalism in his writings. One can and should go out into nature, into the fields and forests and be renewed. It follows, then, that Emerson's religiosity may be read as natural and not supernatural, which may account for his centrality in a tradition of arts and letters which dates to his decisive split with organized religion." The significance of this shift resulted in Emerson's paradigmatic role for transcendentalism. "Transcendentalists believe that finding God depended on neither orthodox (Christianity) nor the Unitarians' sensible exercise of virtue, but on one's inner striving toward spiritual communion with the divine spirit."

== Application ==
=== In photography ===
Walker Evans was a renowned American photographer, known for his visionary process of aligning "photography with Emerson's original desire to absorb and be absorbed into nature, to become a transparent rather than simply reflective eye." Evans spent his career during the Great Depression trying to capture images that would be a mirror representation of Americans surrounded by both nature and man-made objects existing in total harmony.

Emerson's description of the "transparent eyeball" functions as a metaphor for the artist's ability to discern the essential nature of objects and as a way to stress that the transcendental is not formless. The "transparent eyeball" reflects nature's particulars, much in the way that a camera lens exposes; and in the process illuminates… the "unrelieved, bare-faced, revelatory" facts. The transparent eyeball is about capturing and being a part of all of nature and its motion. The camera works in the same fashion. The camera exposes/illuminates all of nature in a single snapshot with more detail and visibility of nature that cannot be taken in by an unaided eye alone.

Just as nature has to be experienced visually for its true meaning to shine forth, the photographic eye has to be present to capture the image. Contrary to what one might think, the 'transparent eyeball' is not a free-floating entity, but a necessary link between the observer and the landscape surrounding him or her.

To visually experience and appreciate nature, as Emerson desired, through a transparent state, an individual has to view it. This is similar to the camera. To photograph an image, the individual must first view the scene, then capture what they see. Thus, the "transparent eyeball" is not free from constraints, but is a tool that the individual needs to become one with nature. However, it is not to be understood that "Emerson did not believe in a fundamental god-driven unity underlying the worldly flux, but rather that art's role was to provide an insight into that unity."

=== In literature ===
According to Amy Hungerford, the influence and use of the transparent eyeball in Pulitzer Prize-winning author Marilynne Robinson's novel Housekeeping is palpable. Hungerford argues that Robinson's protagonist Ruth narrates from the perspective of the transparent eyeball.
