= Housekeeping (film) =

1987 film by Bill Forsyth

- Theatrical release poster
- Directed by: Bill Forsyth
- Screenplay by: Bill Forsyth
- Based on: Housekeeping by Marilynne Robinson
- Produced by: Robert F. Colesberry
- Starring: Christine Lahti
- Cinematography: Michael Coulter
- Edited by: Michael Ellis
- Music by: Michael Gibbs
- Production company: Columbia Pictures
- Distributed by: Columbia Pictures
- Release dates: October 16, 1987 (Vancouver Film Festival); November 25, 1987 (United States)
- Running time: 116 minutes
- Country: United States
- Language: English
- Budget: $5 million
- Box office: $1.1 million

Housekeeping is a 1987 American comedy drama film written and directed by Bill Forsyth, starring Christine Lahti, Sara Walker, and Andrea Burchill. Based on Marilynne Robinson's 1980 novel of the same name, the film follows two sisters in 1950s Idaho who, after their mother's suicide, are raised by their eccentric drifter aunt. The film explores themes of family, belonging, and the conflict between individuality and conformity in a small, judgmental community.

Housekeeping marked Scottish director Forsyth's first American feature film, produced by Columbia Pictures. The film was shot on location mainly in Nelson, British Columbia, Canada, in late 1986.

The film was released theatrically in the United States on November 25, 1987, and received favorable reviews from critics despite underperforming at the box office. Forsyth won two awards for the film at the 1987 Tokyo International Film Festival, while Lahti earned a New York Film Critics Circle award nomination for Best Actress for her performance. Despite its limited availability in the home media market, Housekeeping went on to develop a cult following in the years since its original release.

== Plot ==
In 1950s northern Idaho, a young mother, Helen, leaves her two daughters, four-year-old Ruth and three-year-old Lucille, at her mother Sylvia's home, before driving her car off a cliff into nearby Lake Fingerbone, committing suicide. Sylvia raises the girls for seven years before her death, after which their great-aunts from Spokane, Washington, Lily and Nona, move in to care for them. Ruth and Lucille learn that their grandfather also died in Lake Fingerbone while riding on a train that plummeted off the trestle spanning the lake.

Unable to adjust to the rural environment, Lily and Nona soon enlist Helen's drifter sister, Sylvie, to take over raising the now-teenaged Ruth and Lucille. The sisters immediately observe Sylvie's numerous eccentricities and disregard for social norms. When Lake Fingerbone floods, Sylvie conducts the household as normal despite the main floor being knee-deep in water. While truant from school one day, Ruth and Lucille witness Sylvie sauntering atop the trestle over the lake, appearing as though she intends to leap into the water below.

Sylvie begins hoarding garbage and newspapers in the house, causing tensions to run high, especially from Lucille, who finds Sylvie's way of life unacceptable. After an argument between them, Sylvie leaves the house and sleeps on a park bench. Sylvie attempts to reconcile by washing the cans she has piled up in the kitchen. Both Ruth and Lucille continue a streak of rebellion, skipping school regularly. Lucille eventually runs away, moving in with her schoolteacher, Miss Royce, devastating Ruth.

One morning, Sylvie leads Ruth to the lake where she steals a fisherman's boat, and the two row to an abandoned homestead. Sylvie claims to hear voices of invisible children, and convinces Ruth that children lurk amongst the surrounding woods. Later that night, Ruth awakens in the boat to find Sylvie has rowed them under the trestle. Sylvie tells Ruth that the train in which her father died is in the water beneath them. Sylvie and Ruth climb the trestle and hop onto a train, riding it into town.

At school, Lucille implores Ruth to move out of the house. A local sheriff sends three church ladies to the home to check on Ruth. Despite Sylvie and Ruth's attempts to clean the home, the church ladies observe stockpiles of newspapers and trash, and deem Sylvie an unsuitable guardian. A distraught Sylvie stays up all night cleaning the house, and awakens Ruth to a formal breakfast. Sylvie and Ruth burn Sylvie's massive newspaper collection, and Sylvie attempts to coach Ruth into living a more traditional life.

Late one night, the sheriff stops by the house and observes the lights on and Ruth still awake inside. The sheriff chastises Sylvie for allowing this, and unsuccessfully attempts to coax Ruth into leaving with him before vowing to return the next day. That night, Sylvie and Ruth set fire to the house, in an attempt to burn it to the ground, the sound of neighbours swarming the scene thwarting their effort. They run off to catch a passing train heard in the distance. Arriving too late the two decide to walk across the trestle together, into the night, leaving Fingerbone behind them.

== Cast ==
- Christine Lahti as Sylvie
- Sara Walker as Ruth
  - Tonya Tanner as Young Ruth
- Andrea Burchill as Lucille
  - Leah Penny as Young Lucille
- Anne Pitoniak as Aunt Lily
- Barbara Reese as Aunt Nona
- Georgie Collins as Grandmother Sylvia
- Margot Pinvidic as Helen
- Bill Smillie as Sheriff
- Wayne Robson as Principal
- Betty Phillips as Mrs. Jardine
- Karen Elizabeth Austin as Mrs. Paterson
- Dolores Drake as Mrs. Walker

== Production ==
=== Development ===
Housekeeping was the first North American film by writer and director Bill Forsyth, whose previous films—That Sinking Feeling (1979), Gregory's Girl (1981), Local Hero (1983), and Comfort and Joy (1984)—were produced in Scotland. The prospect of creating a film based on Marilynne Robinson's 1980 novel brought Forsyth to North America. He later described his film as "a commercial to get people to read the novel".

When an actress friend sent Forsyth the book, he loved it. "There is in it that generational haunting that affects most of us," he said, "those familial burdens we all carry: the grandfather in the story they never knew but who seems to be there all the time."

Forsyth said, "I had always written the story and the script before, and therefore I was the expert on the characters. But these characters, this strange woman and those two unpredictable young girls, were up for grabs. I began to look forward to that half-hour each morning when we discussed the characters and what the day's scenes meant."

He bought the screen rights and took two years to finance the picture. "We took it to studios who had expressed interest in it; we didn't just send it out wildly. I didn't get anywhere. I tried to work out various co-productions. At one point it was going to be a Canadian-Norwegian co-production, but that fell apart. I had some English money, but not enough."

=== Casting ===
Diane Keaton was originally cast in the lead role of Sylvie in early 1986, after which Cannon Films agreed to finance the project. Forsyth recalled that Keaton had admired his previous films, and the two had met in New York in 1983. After presenting Keaton with the novel and expressing his interest in making a film adaptation, she agreed to sign on to the project. However, on August 4, 1986, six weeks before filming was scheduled to begin, Keaton dropped out, after which Cannon Films withdrew as well. According to Forsyth, Keaton left the film over disagreements with him over the direction of her character, with Keaton wanting to "make the story more dramatic" by pitting the character of Sylvie against the townspeople. Forsyth, wanting to remain as close to the novel as possible, disagreed with Keaton's approach.

Forsyth succeeded in raising finance from David Puttnam, who produced Local Hero (1983) and who had become Columbia Pictures' head of production. Following Keaton's departure from the project, Christine Lahti auditioned and was signed for the lead. Forsyth reflected that Lahti was "ideal" for the role "in terms of persona, and everything."

Sarah Walker and Andrea Burchill, who portray the adolescent and teenage sisters, were both amateur actors who Forsyth said "fell into the roles naturally." Forsyth commented that he had worried about his ability to effectively direct the film, but was relieved upon beginning work with the actors: "I thought that a man directing a film about female relationships would be a big problem. As it turned out, the cast were experts, all being women, and everything took care of itself."

=== Filming ===
Forsyth originally intended to film Housekeeping in writer Marilynne Robinson's birthplace of Sandpoint, Idaho, on which the fictional town of Fingerbone was loosely based, but upon visiting, found that it had become too modernized to be a convincing stand-in for a 1950s American city. Instead, the production chose to film in Castlegar and Nelson, British Columbia, Canada and the skating scenes in Spray Lakes, Canmore, Alberta, Canada. Principal photography began September 22, 1986 and ended in December 1986.

During filming, the Canadian Pacific Railway rescinded on their agreement to shoot portions of the film using the railway's train tracks, after executives were "upset" by scenes in the screenplay featuring young children walking along tracks and characters trainhopping. After negotiations between the Canadian Pacific Railway and Columbia Pictures, the railway eventually agreed to allow filming to resume on their train tracks and equipment.

The trestle bridge featured in the film was built by the production designers, spanning approximately 125 feet (38 m) and standing 20 feet (6.1 m) tall.

== Release ==
The film was screened at the Vancouver International Film Festival on October 16, 1987, followed by an exhibition at the London Film Festival on November 24, 1987. Columbia Pictures released the film in the United States on November 25, 1987, over the Thanksgiving weekend. By that time, Puttnam had already been fired from Columbia, and without his support the studio gave Housekeeping minimal promotion due to its ties to the studio's ousted chairman. "People really go and see what they're told to go and see through advertising," said Forsyth in 1989, "and [Columbia] didn't spend any money advertising [Housekeeping] or promoting it because David had left by that time." When revisiting the film over 20 years later, Forsyth joked "I don't think it was released. It escaped for a bit."

=== Home media ===
The film was released on VHS in the United States on July 8, 1988. It has never been distributed in North America on either DVD or Blu-ray, but it was given a dual-format release in the United Kingdom by Powerhouse Films in 2017. The Powerhouse DVD and Blu-ray releases feature newly-commissioned interviews with Forsyth, cinematographer Michael Coulter, editor Michael Ellis, and Marilynne Robinson, the author of the source novel. A 1994 audio Q&A session with Forsyth at the National Film Theatre of the British Film Institute is also included.

== Reception ==
=== Box office ===
There was minimal promotion and Housekeeping was a box-office bomb, grossing $1,083,282 in the United States against a $5 million budget.

=== Critical response ===
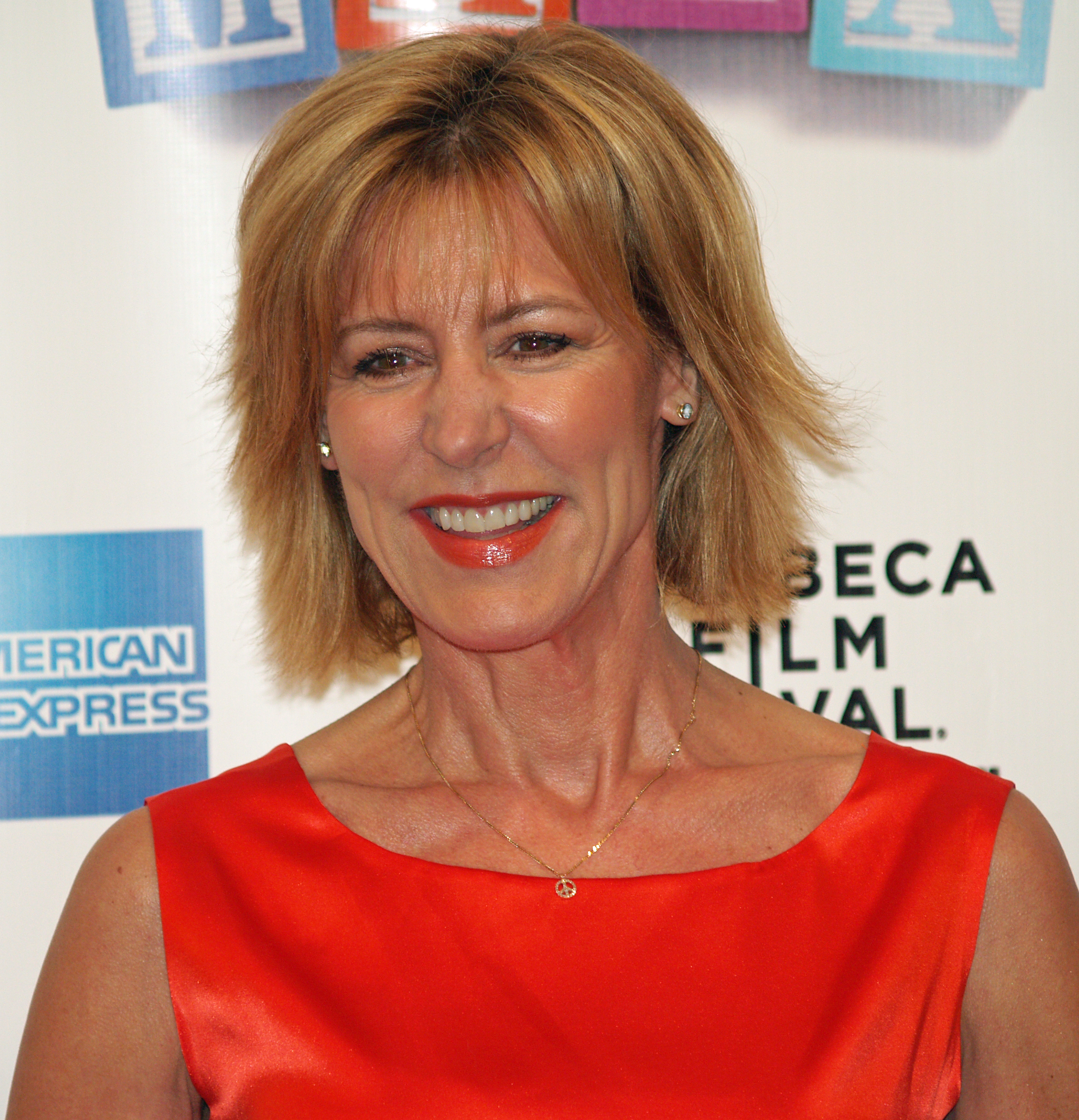
Christine Lahti received critical acclaim for her portrayal of Sylvie

Despite the lack of financial success, Housekeeping did find critical acclaim and its reputation has continued to grow despite its limited availability.

On the review aggregator website Rotten Tomatoes, 92% of 13 critics' reviews are positive.

Critic Jonathan Rosenbaum rated it as a "masterpiece" for the Chicago Reader, writing that he was most impressed by Forsyth's fluidity and grace as a storyteller. Describing the story as "a kind of feminist version of Huckleberry Finn," he also praised all three of the film's main actresses and suggested that it "may have taken a Scotsman to show us the contemporary importance, the depths and radiance, of Robinson's novel."

Dave Kehr of the Chicago Tribune wrote that Forsyth had "intentionally undermined his usual whimsical style by burrowing down to the deepest assumptions and implications of its nonconformism" and applauded him for making such an "audacious departure." Similarly, Kehr also praised Lahti for delivering an "arresting performance" that was unlike the roles she had already been known for. Ted Mahar of The Oregonian similarly lauded Lahti's performance, writing that she "brings [the character] to life in a way no one else could." Newsday's Joseph Gelmis praised Lahti as "brilliant," and compared the film favorably to Woody Allen's Interiors (1978), describing it as "a profoundly subtle, austere, melancholic and poignant mood piece."

In his review for The New York Times, Vincent Canby described the film as a "haunting comedy about impossible attachments and doomed affection in a world divided between two kinds of people" (those who embrace random existence, and those who try to impose reason and order on random existence). Canby noted that Forsyth was able to "make us care equally" for both sisters, and called Lahti's performance "spellbinding" and "role of her film career."

In his review for the Chicago Sun-Times, Roger Ebert gave the film four out of four stars, calling it "one of the strangest and best films of the year." He felt Lahti was the perfect choice for the central role of Sylvie.

On the AllMovie website, Housekeeping has an editorial rating of four and a half out of five stars.

=== Accolades ===
Award/association	Year	Category	Recipient(s) and nominee(s)	Result	Ref.
New York Film Critics Circle	1988	Best Actress	Christine Lahti	Nominated	
Tokyo International Film Festival	1987	Best Screenplay	Bill Forsyth	Won	
Tokyo International Film Festival	1987	Special Jury Prize	Bill Forsyth	Won	
Tokyo International Film Festival	1987	Tokyo Grand Prix	Bill Forsyth	Nominated	
USC Scripter Awards	1989	USC Scripter Award	Bill Forsyth; Marilynne Robinson	Nominated	

== Legacy ==
Despite its limited availability in the home media market, Housekeeping went on to develop a cult following in the years after its original release. In 2006, The Guardian included the film in a list of "50 Lost Movie Classics."

In 2008, critic Roger Ebert hosted a special screening of Housekeeping at his annual film festival in Chicago where Forsyth and Lahti participated in a post-screening discussion. When Lahti was asked about the work she was most proud of in her career, she responded "I might be most proud of [Housekeeping], I just love it so much."

== Sources ==
- Writer-Director Bill Forsyth on ‘Housekeeping’ (Blu-ray documentary interview). Indicator/Powerhouse Films. 2017.
