= Mother Country =

A mother country is a person's homeland.

== Books ==
- Mother Country: Britain, the Welfare State, and Nuclear Pollution, a 1989 non-fiction book by Marilynne Robinson
- Mother Country (novel), a 2002 novel by Libby Purves
- Mother Country: Britain's Black Community on the Home Front 1939–45, a 2010 history book by Stephen Bourne (writer)

== Other uses ==
- Mother/Country, a 2001 documentary by Tina Gharavi
- Mother Country, a 2011 American film starring Cindy Pickett
- "Mother Country", a 1969 song by John Stewart from the album California Bloodlines

== See also ==
- Motherland (disambiguation)
