= Transcendental Style in Film =

1972 book by Paul Schrader

- Author: Paul Schrader
- Language: English
- Publisher: University of California Press
- Publication date: 1972
- Publication place: United States
- Pages: 194
- ISBN: 0520020383

Transcendental Style in Film: Ozu, Bresson, Dreyer is a 1972 book of film criticism by the American writer Paul Schrader. It is about spirituality and contemplation in cinema, analyzing the films of Yasujirō Ozu, Robert Bresson and Carl Theodor Dreyer. Schrader argues that certain of their techniques and approaches, which he calls the transcendental style, are shared across cultural borders. A revised and expanded edition was published in 2018 and includes a 35-page introduction where Schrader covers newer contemplative films.

Reviewing the book in 2018, MovieMaker called it "the perfect example of why eating your cultural vegetables can be endlessly rewarding, potentially even life-changing".
