= Motherland (disambiguation) =

Motherland is the place of one's birth, the place of one's ancestors, or the place of origin of an ethnic group.

Motherland may also refer to:

== Art ==
- Motherland statues, Russia
- Personifications of Russia, including a list of monuments called Motherland
- Mother Ukraine Monument, Motherland statue, Ukraine

== Film and television ==
- Motherland (1927 film), a British silent war film
- Motherland (2010 film), a documentary
- Motherland (2015 film), a Turkish drama
- Motherland (2022 film), a documentary about the Second Nagorno-Karabakh War
- Motherland (2023 Canadian film), a short drama film
- Motherland (2023 Peruvian film), a drama
- Motherland (British TV series), a 2016 sitcom
- Motherland (Israeli TV series), a 2025 historical drama
- Motherland: Fort Salem, a 2020 American science fiction drama series
- Motherland Pictures, an Indian film production company

== Music ==
=== Anthems ===
- "Motherland" (anthem), the national anthem of Mauritius
- National Song (Montserrat), also called "Motherland"

=== Albums ===
- Motherland (Natalie Merchant album), 2001
- Motherland (Arsonists Get All the Girls album), 2011
- Motherland (Daedalus album), 2011

=== Songs ===
- "Motherland", a song by Crystal Kay from CK5, 2004

== Other uses ==
- Motherland Party (disambiguation), the name of several political groups

== See also ==
- Mother Country (disambiguation)
