= Gilead (novel) =

2004 novel by Marilynne Robinson

- Cover of the first edition
- Author: Marilynne Robinson
- Language: English
- Series: First of a tetralogy
- Genre: Novel
- Publisher: Farrar, Straus and Giroux
- Publication date: November 4, 2004
- Publication place: United States
- Media type: Print (Hardcover and Paperback)
- Pages: 256 pp.
- ISBN: 978-0-374-15389-2
- Dewey Decimal: 813/.54 22
- LC Class: PS3568.O3125 G55 2004
- Followed by: Home

Gilead is a 2004 novel by American writer Marilynne Robinson. It won the 2005 Pulitzer Prize for Fiction and the National Book Critics Circle Award. It is Robinson's second novel, following Housekeeping (1980). Gilead is an epistolary novel, as the entire narrative is a single, continuing, albeit episodic, document, written on several occasions in a form combining a journal and a memoir. It comprises the fictional autobiography of John Ames, an elderly, white Congregationalist pastor in the small, secluded town of Gilead, Iowa (also fictional), who knows that he is dying of a heart condition. At the beginning of the book, the date is established as 1956. Ames explains that he is writing an account of his life for his seven-year-old son, who will have few memories of him. Ames indicates he was born in 1880. He said that he was seventy-six years old at the time of writing.

== Plot ==
In 1956, 76-year-old Reverend John Ames, a Congregationalist minister in Gilead, Iowa, is aware that he is nearing the end of his life due to a heart condition. Wanting to leave a testament for his seven-year-old son, Ames writes a long letter filled with reflections on his past, faith, and the history of his family.

Ames recounts the life of his grandfather, an abolitionist preacher who fought in the American Civil War and was deeply committed to radical activism, and his father, who was a pacifist preacher disillusioned by violence. These generational conflicts shape Ames's theology and his own struggles with mortality.

Ames also describes his relationships with members of his congregation and his close friend Boughton, a Presbyterian minister. A key source of tension arises with Boughton’s prodigal son, Jack, whose return to Gilead unsettles Ames. Jack has a troubled past and seeks redemption, but Ames remains wary of his intentions. Eventually, Ames comes to recognize Jack’s suffering and offers him a blessing before he departs.

== Influences ==
According to Robinson, the fictional town of Gilead ("Gilead" means 'hill of testimony' in the Bible – Genesis 31:21) is based on the real town of Tabor, Iowa, located in the southwest corner of the state and well known for its importance in the abolition movement. Likewise, the character of the narrator's grandfather is loosely based on the real-life story of John Todd, a congregationalist minister from Tabor who was a conductor on the Underground Railroad, and who stored weapons, supplies and ammunition used by abolitionist John Brown in his "invasion" of Missouri in 1857 to free a group of enslaved people, and later—without Todd's knowledge or involvement—in his 1859 raid on the U.S. military arsenal at Harpers Ferry, West Virginia. Robinson talks about Ames's grandfather's involvement in the Civil War. She mentions an illness known as 'camp fever'. The term was generally used to describe Typho-malarial fever. Symptoms included pronounced chills followed by fever, abdominal tenderness, nausea, general debility, diarrhea, urine retention, and tongue furring. Also, as John Ames describes his sermons in his letter, he tells his son that there is one he has burned before he is supposed to preach it. This sermon was written around the time of the Spanish Influenza.

Regarding Robinson's theological influences in Gilead, she has explained the importance of primary Calvinist texts, particularly Calvin's Institutes of the Christian Religion. Regarding Calvin's Institutes, Robinson states in her Yves Simone lecture entitled "The Freedom of a Christian" that "one of the reasons these texts are important to me is because they have everything to do with my own theology certainly, with my aesthetic perhaps, and in so far as I can say I have an intention in writing, they have everything to do with my intention".

== Reception ==
=== Critical reception ===
Kirkus Reviews said that "Robinson has composed, with its cascading perfections of symbols, a novel as big as a nation, as quiet as thought, and moving as prayer. Matchless and towering." Publishers Weekly said that "Robinson's prose is beautiful, shimmering and precise; the revelations are subtle but never muted when they come, and the careful telling carries the breath of suspense."

James Wood, writing for The New York Times, called the novel "a beautiful work" that was "demanding, grave and lucid" and said that "As the novel progresses, its language becomes sparer, lovelier". Sam Jordison, in The Guardian, said that "there’s a sense of bright, piercing joy, found in sharp and beautiful passages."

=== Awards and lists ===
In a poll of US literary critics that was conducted by BBC Culture and had its results shared in January 2015, Gilead was voted the fourth greatest novel written since 2000. In 2019, the novel was ranked 2nd on The Guardian's list of the 100 best books of the 21st century. On November 5, 2019, BBC News listed Gilead on its list of the 100 most influential novels. Former President of the United States Barack Obama lists the novel as one of his favorites. In 2024, the novel was ranked 10th on The New York Times's list of its 100 Best Books of the 21st Century.

== Societal impact ==
Gilead has been recognized as a text that corrects modern misconceptions regarding John Calvin, Calvinism, and the Puritans. Robinson said in a lecture entitled "The Freedom of a Christian," that she thinks "that one of the things that has happened in American Cultural History is that John Calvin has been very much misrepresented. As a consequence of that, the parts of American Culture that he influenced are very much misrepresented". She expounds upon this idea in her book of essays, The Death of Adam. She writes that the Puritans should "by no means be characterized by fear or hatred of the body, anxiety about sex or denigration of women, yet for some reason, Puritanism is uniquely regarded as synonymous with the preoccupations." Roger Kimball, in his review of The Death of Adam in The New York Times wrote, "We all know that the Puritans were dour, sex-hating, joy-abominating folk – except that, as Robinson shows, this widely embraced caricature is a calumny". The common modern characterization of the Calvinists as haters of the physical world and joyless exclusivists is the stereotype that Robinson works to deconstruct in Gilead through a representation of what she considers to be a more accurate understanding of Calvinist doctrine that she derives mainly from the original texts, specifically Calvin's Institutes of the Christian Religion.

The novel has also been the focus of debates on Christian multiculturalism in literature. University of Victoria professor of American Literature Christopher Douglas claims that Gilead builds a "contemporary Christian multicultural identity suitably cleansed of the complexity of [...] 'Christian slavery'." He contextualizes the work within the political resurgence of fundamentalist and evangelical Christianity in the last four decades.

Former President of the United States Barack Obama lists the novel as one of his favorites. On September 14, 2015, in Des Moines, Iowa, in a reversal of the usual journalistic convention, President Obama interviewed Marilynne Robinson for The New York Review of Books, and told her,

I first picked up Gilead, one of your most wonderful books, here in Iowa. Because I was campaigning at the time, and there's a lot of downtime when you're driving between towns and when you get home late from campaigning. ... And I've told you this — one of my favorite characters in fiction is a pastor in Gilead, Iowa, named John Ames, who is gracious and courtly and a little bit confused about how to reconcile his faith with all the various travails that his family goes through. And I was just — I just fell in love with the character, fell in love with the book...

== Companion novels ==
Robinson has used characters and events from Gilead in three subsequent novels. Home (2008) retells events of the story from the perspective of their friends and neighbors, the Boughtons. Lila (2014) retells Ames's courtship and marriage from her perspective. Jack (2020) tells the story of the Boughtons' black sheep, detailing his relationship with a woman of color, a union unknown to his family.
