= Paul Schrader =

American film director (born 1946)

- Schrader in 2026
- Born: Paul Joseph Schrader; July 22, 1946 (age 80); Grand Rapids, Michigan, US
- Education: Calvin College (BA); University of California, Los Angeles (MA)
- Occupations: Film director; screenwriter
- Years active: 1974–present
- Spouses: Jeannine Oppewall (m. 1969; div. 1976) Mary Beth Hurt (m. 1983; died 2026)
- Children: 2
- Relatives: Leonard Schrader (brother)
- Awards: Laurel Award for Screenwriting Achievement; AFI Franklin J. Schaffner Award; Venice Film Festival Golden Lion
- Website: paulschrader.org

Paul Joseph Schrader (/ˈʃreɪdər/ SHRAY-dər; born July 22, 1946) is an American screenwriter, film director, and film critic. He first became known for writing the screenplay of Martin Scorsese's Taxi Driver (1976). He later continued his collaboration with Scorsese, writing or co-writing Raging Bull (1980), The Last Temptation of Christ (1988), and Bringing Out the Dead (1999). Schrader has also worked extensively as a director: his 23 films include Blue Collar (1978), Hardcore (1979), American Gigolo (1980), Mishima: A Life in Four Chapters (1985), Light Sleeper (1992), Affliction (1997), and First Reformed (2017), with the last of these earning him his first Academy Award nomination. Schrader's work frequently depicts "man in a room" stories which feature isolated, troubled men confronting an existential crisis.

Raised in a strict Calvinist family, Schrader attended Calvin College before pursuing film studies at UCLA on the encouragement of film critic Pauline Kael. He then worked as a film scholar and critic, publishing the book Transcendental Style in Film: Ozu, Bresson, Dreyer (1972) before transitioning to screenwriting in 1974. The success of Taxi Driver in 1976 brought greater attention to his work, and Schrader began directing his own films, beginning with Blue Collar (co-written with his brother, Leonard Schrader). Schrader has described three of his recent films as a loose trilogy: First Reformed (2017), The Card Counter (2021), and Master Gardener (2022).

== Early life and education ==
Schrader was born in Grand Rapids, Michigan, on July 22, 1946, the son of Joan (née Fisher) and Charles A. Schrader, an executive. Schrader's family attended the Calvinist Christian Reformed Church. Schrader's mother was of Dutch descent, the daughter of emigrants from Friesland, while Schrader's paternal grandfather was from a German family that had come to the US through Canada.

His early life was based upon the religion's strict principles and parental education. He did not see a film until he was seventeen years old when he was able to sneak away from home. In an interview, he stated that The Absent-Minded Professor was the first film he saw. In his own words, he was "very unimpressed" by it, while Wild in the Country, which he saw sometime later, had quite some effect on him. Schrader attributes his intellectual rather than emotional approach towards movies and movie-making to his having no adolescent movie memories.

Schrader earned his B.A. in philosophy with a minor in theology from Calvin College but decided against becoming a minister. He then earned an M.A. in film studies at the UCLA Film School upon the recommendation of Pauline Kael, who encouraged him to be a film critic.

Schrader first became a film critic, writing for the Los Angeles Free Press and later for Cinema magazine. His book Transcendental Style in Film: Ozu, Bresson, Dreyer, which examines the similarities between Robert Bresson, Yasujirō Ozu, and Carl Theodor Dreyer, was published in 1972. Other film-makers who made a lasting impression on Schrader are John Ford, Jean Renoir, Roberto Rossellini, Alfred Hitchcock, and Sam Peckinpah. Renoir's The Rules of the Game he called the "quintessential movie" which represents "all of the cinema".

== Career ==
=== 1974–1989: Screenwriter and directorial debut ===
In 1974, Schrader and his brother Leonard co-wrote The Yakuza, a film set in the Japanese crime world. The script became the subject of a bidding war, eventually selling for $325,000. The film was directed by Sydney Pollack and starred Robert Mitchum. Robert Towne, best known for Chinatown, also received a credit for his rewrite. Although The Yakuza failed commercially, it brought Schrader to the attention of the new generation of Hollywood directors. In 1975, he wrote the script for Obsession for Brian De Palma. Schrader wrote an early draft of Steven Spielberg's Close Encounters of the Third Kind (1977), but Spielberg disliked the script, calling it "terribly guilt-ridden", and opted for something lighter. He also wrote an early draft of Rolling Thunder (1977), which the film's producers reworked without his participation. He disapproved of the final film. Schrader's script about an obsessed New York City taxi driver became Martin Scorsese's film Taxi Driver, which was nominated for the Oscar for Best Picture and won the Palme d'Or at the Cannes Film Festival. Besides Taxi Driver (1976), Scorsese also drew on scripts by Schrader for Raging Bull (1980), co-credited to Mardik Martin; The Last Temptation of Christ (1988); and Bringing Out the Dead (1999).

Thanks partly to critical acclaim for Taxi Driver, Schrader was able to direct his first feature, Blue Collar (1978), co-written with his brother Leonard. Blue Collar features Richard Pryor, Harvey Keitel, and Yaphet Kotto as car factory workers attempting to escape their socio-economic rut through theft and blackmail. He has described the film as challenging to make, because of the artistic and personal tensions between him and the cast. During principal photography, he suffered an on-set mental collapse, which led him to reconsider his career seriously. John Milius acted as executive producer on the following year's Hardcore, again written by Schrader, a film with many autobiographical parallels in his depiction of the Calvinist milieu of Grand Rapids, and in the character of George C. Scott, which was based on Schrader's father. Among Paul Schrader's films in the 1980s were American Gigolo starring Richard Gere (1980), his Cat People (1982) a remake of the 1942 film Cat People, and Mishima: A Life in Four Chapters (1985). Inspired by Japanese writer Yukio Mishima, the film interweaves episodes from Mishima's life with dramatizations of segments from his books. Mishima was nominated for the top prize (the Palme d'Or) at the Cannes Film Festival. Francis Ford Coppola and George Lucas served as executive producers. Schrader also directed Patty Hearst (1988), about the kidnapping and transformation of the Hearst Corporation heiress. In 1987, he was a member of the jury at the 37th Berlin International Film Festival.

=== 1990–2016: Career fluctuations ===
His 1990s work included the travelers-in-Venice tale The Comfort of Strangers (1990), adapted by Harold Pinter from the Ian McEwan novel, and Light Sleeper (1992), a sympathetic study of a drug dealer vying for a normal life. In 2005, Schrader described Light Sleeper as his "most personal" film. In 1997, he made Touch (1997), based on an Elmore Leonard novel about a young man seemingly able to cure the sick by the laying on of hands. In 1998, Schrader won critical acclaim for the drama Affliction. The film tells the story of a troubled small-town policeman (Nick Nolte) who becomes obsessed with solving the mystery behind a fatal hunting accident. Schrader's script was based on the novel by Russell Banks. The film was nominated for multiple awards, including two Academy Awards for acting (for Nolte and James Coburn). Schrader received the Austin Film Festival's Distinguished Screenwriter Award the same year. In 1999, Schrader received the Laurel Award for Screenwriting Achievement from the Writers Guild of America.

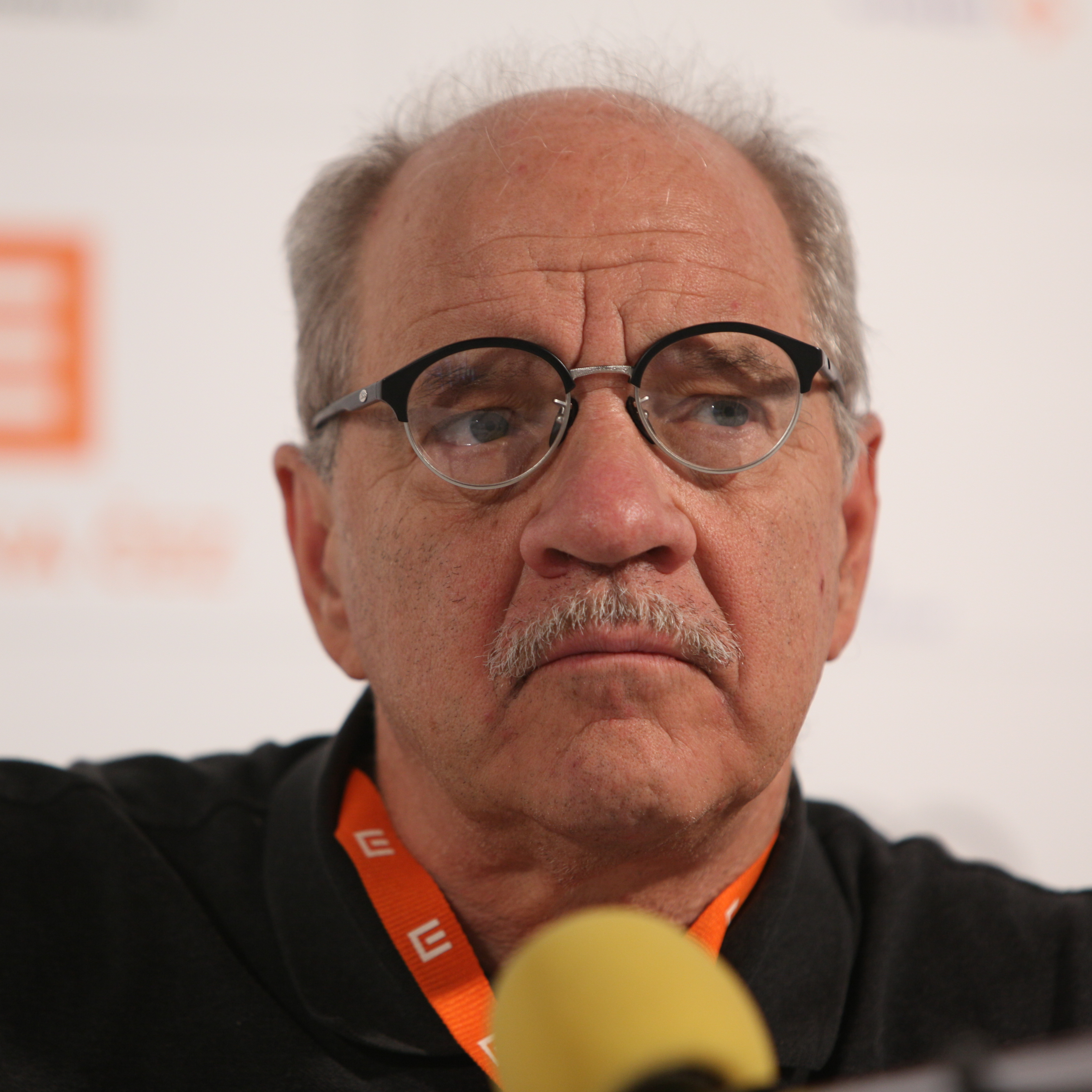
Schrader at the Karlovy Vary International Film Festival 2009

In 2002, he directed the well received biopic Auto Focus, based on the life and murder of Hogan's Heroes actor Bob Crane. In 2003, Schrader made entertainment headlines after being fired from The Exorcist: Dominion, a prequel film to the horror classic The Exorcist from 1973. The film's production companies Morgan Creek Productions and Warner Bros. Pictures intensely disliked the film Schrader had made. Director Renny Harlin was hired to re-shoot nearly the entire movie, which was released as Exorcist: The Beginning on August 20, 2004, to disastrously negative reviews and embarrassing box office receipts. Warner Bros. and Morgan Creek put over $80 million into the endeavor, and Harlin's film only made back $41 million domestically. Schrader's version of the film eventually premiered at the Brussels International Festival of Fantastic Film on March 18, 2005, as Exorcist: The Original Prequel. Due to extreme interest in Schrader's version from critics and cinephiles alike, Warner Bros. agreed to give the film a limited theatrical release later that year under the title Dominion: Prequel to the Exorcist. The film was only shown on 110 screens around the United States and made just $251,000. The critics liked Schrader's version much better than Harlin's. However, Schrader's film ultimately met with a generally negative reaction.

After that, Schrader filmed The Walker (2007), starring Woody Harrelson as a male escort caught up in a political murder enquiry, and the Israel-set Adam Resurrected (2008), which stars Jeff Goldblum and Willem Dafoe. Schrader headed the International Jury of the 2007 Berlin International Film Festival and in 2011 became a jury member for the ongoing Filmaka short film contest. On July 2, 2009, Schrader was awarded the inaugural Lifetime Achievement in Screenwriting award at the ScreenLit Festival in Nottingham, England. Several of his films were shown at the festival, including Mishima: A Life in Four Chapters, which followed the presentation of the award by director Shane Meadows.

After five years of trying and failing to find funding to make feature films, Schrader returned with The Canyons (2013), an erotic dramatic thriller written by Bret Easton Ellis and starring Lindsay Lohan and adult-film star James Deen. The film was one of the first films to use the website Kickstarter to crowd-source its funding. Schrader also used the website Let It Cast to have unknown actors submit their audition tapes over the internet. American Apparel provided some wardrobe for the film. The film was ultimately made for just $250,000 and had a limited theatrical release from IFC Films on August 2, 2013. The film was poorly received by general critics and audiences. The film only made $56,000 in theaters but found later success when released on various Video on Demand platforms.

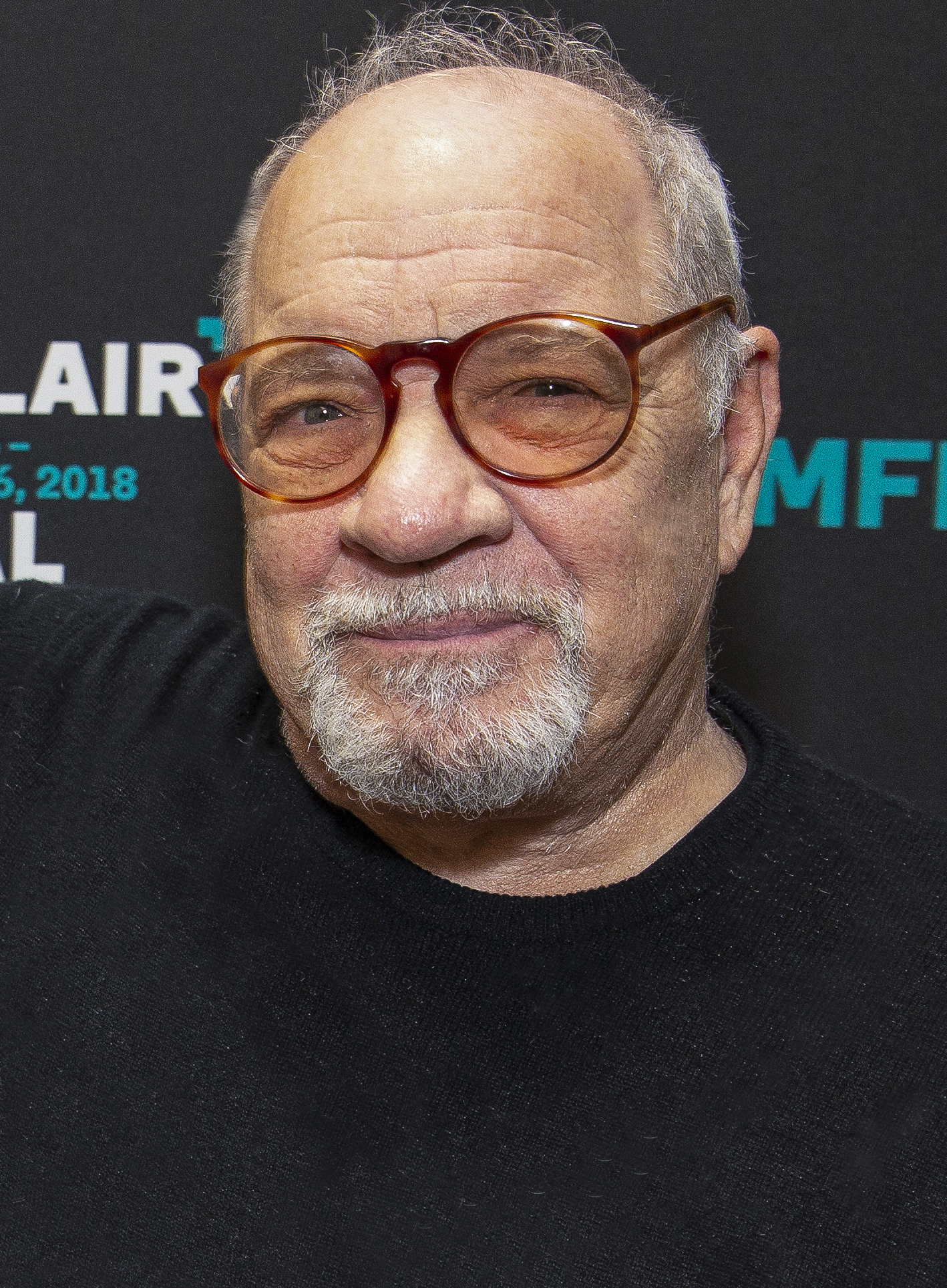
Schrader in 2018

In 2014, Schrader directed The Dying of the Light, an espionage thriller starring Nicolas Cage as a government agent suffering from a deadly disease, Anton Yelchin and Irène Jacob. In post-production Schrader was denied final cut by the film's producers. The film was negatively received by many film critics and was a box-office bomb. Schrader later recut Dying of the Light into the separate, more experimental work Dark, which received more positive reviews.

=== 2017–present: Career resurgence ===
Schrader's dramatic thriller First Reformed, starring Ethan Hawke, premiered at the 2017 Venice Film Festival and received critical acclaim. Schrader received his first Academy Award nomination for the film in the category Best Original Screenplay. In 2021, he directed the crime drama film The Card Counter, starring Oscar Isaac and Tiffany Haddish. The film also premiered at the 2021 Venice Film Festival and was widely lauded by critics. Schrader grouped these two films into a loose trilogy with another thriller, Master Gardener, starring Joel Edgerton and Sigourney Weaver. Like the rest of the trilogy, it premiered at the Venice Film Festival in 2022, where Schrader was awarded the Golden Lion Honorary Award.

In 2023, it was confirmed Schrader would write and direct Oh, Canada, an adaptation of his friend Russell Banks' novel, Foregone, starring Richard Gere and Jacob Elordi. Additionally, Schrader has written a western called Three Guns at Dawn, for Antoine Fuqua to direct; a drama about a trauma nurse called R.N for Elisabeth Moss to star in and direct; and a script about a sex addict called Non Compos Mentis, which he intended to direct.

== Theatre career ==
Schrader has written two stage plays, Berlinale and Cleopatra Club. The latter saw its premiere at the Powerhouse Theater in Poughkeepsie, New York, in 1995 and its foreign language debut in Vienna in 2011.

== Themes ==
Schrader has repeatedly referred to Taxi Driver, American Gigolo, Light Sleeper, The Canyons, The Walker, First Reformed, and The Card Counter as "a man in a room" stories. The protagonist in each film changes from an angry, then narcissistic, later anxious character, to a person who hides behind a mask of superficiality.

Although many of his films or scripts are based on real-life biographies (Raging Bull, Mishima: A Life in Four Chapters, Patty Hearst, Auto Focus), Schrader confessed having problems with biographical films due to their altering of actual events, which he tried to prevent by imposing structures and stylization.

== Personal life ==
=== Marriage and health issues ===
Schrader battled a cocaine addiction, which contributed to his divorce from his first wife, art director Jeannine Oppewall. He then moved from Los Angeles to Japan in hopes of getting his life on track, finally quitting drugs around 1990. His second marriage was to actress Mary Beth Hurt, who has appeared in smaller roles in a variety of his films. Together they have two children, a daughter and a son.

In September 2022, Schrader was hospitalized for "breathing problems". In January 2023, he and his wife moved from New York's suburban Putnam County to a luxury assisted-living facility in Manhattan's Hudson Yards area, where Hurt received treatment for her Alzheimer's. She died in March 2026.

=== Religious beliefs ===
Schrader is a Christian. Raised Calvinist, Schrader abandoned religion in his young adulthood, before returning to Christianity later in life. He became an Episcopalian after the birth of his children. His films frequently feature religious themes. As of 2018, he attends a Presbyterian church. However, Schrader has now emphasized that he considers himself to be just a Christian.

=== Political views ===
In December 2016, Schrader referred to the then-upcoming Trump presidency as "a call to violence" and said "we should be willing to take arms. Like Old John Brown." He quickly deleted the post, but was visited by the New York City Police Department Counterterrorism Bureau for threatening violence. Schrader expressed some regret for his post (blaming it on him drinking alcohol and taking an Ambien), apologizing for his post's violent rhetoric, but not for his comments critical of Trump.

In 2021, Schrader attacked cancel culture, describing it as "infectious...like the Delta virus". In 2022, Schrader criticized that year's Sight and Sound Greatest Films poll, describing it as a "politically correct rejiggering", with its selection of Jeanne Dielman, 23 quai du Commerce, 1080 Bruxelles as the greatest film of all time being the product of "distorted woke reappraisal". In 2023, he also criticized the perceived politicization of the 95th Academy Awards, writing that the Oscars' "scramble to be woke" have made their ceremony "mean less each year".

=== Allegations of sexual harassment ===
In 2025, civil court documents made public allegations of sexual harassment and sexual assault against Schrader by an unidentified woman who was his assistant. The alleged incidents took place between 2021 and 2024. Schrader reportedly had agreed to a confidential settlement with his accuser but ultimately reneged. Schrader's attorney, Phillip Kessler, responded that there were two kisses during nights of drinking – one at the Cannes Film Festival in May 2024 and another some months prior – but that Schrader backed down after his advances were unreciprocated.

=== Favorite films ===
In 2012, Schrader participated in the Sight & Sound film polls of that year. Held every ten years to select the greatest films of all time, contemporary directors were asked to select ten films of their choice. Schrader gave the following ten in alphabetical order.

- Citizen Kane (1941)
- The Conformist (1970)
- In the Mood for Love (2000)
- The Lady Eve (1941)
- Orpheus (1950)
- Pickpocket (1959)
- The Rules of the Game (1939)
- Tokyo Story (1953)
- Vertigo (1958)
- The Wild Bunch (1969)

In 2022, Schrader updated his list, including:

- Pickpocket
- Tokyo Story
- Persona (1966)
- The Rules of the Game
- The Conformist
- Vertigo
- The Wild Bunch
- Metropolis (1927)
- The Godfather (1972)
- The Lady Eve

== Filmography ==
=== Film ===
Year	Title	Director	Writer	Notes
1974	The Yakuza	No	Yes	
1976	Taxi Driver	No	Yes	
1976	Obsession	No	Yes	
1977	Rolling Thunder	No	Yes	
1978	Blue Collar	Yes	Yes	
1979	Hardcore	Yes	Yes	
1979	Old Boyfriends	No	Yes	Also executive producer
1980	American Gigolo	Yes	Yes	
1980	Raging Bull	No	Yes	
1982	Cat People	Yes	Uncredited	
1985	Mishima: A Life in Four Chapters	Yes	Yes	
1986	The Mosquito Coast	No	Yes	
1987	Light of Day	Yes	Yes	
1988	Patty Hearst	Yes	No	
1988	The Last Temptation of Christ	No	Yes	
1990	The Comfort of Strangers	Yes	No	
1992	Light Sleeper	Yes	Yes	
1994	Witch Hunt	Yes	No	TV movie
1995	New Blue	Yes	Yes	Documentary short
1996	City Hall	No	Yes	
1997	Touch	Yes	Yes	
1997	Affliction	Yes	Yes	
1999	Forever Mine	Yes	Yes	
1999	Bringing Out the Dead	No	Yes	
2002	Auto Focus	Yes	No	
2004	Suspect Zero	No	Uncredited	
2005	Dominion: Prequel to the Exorcist	Yes	No	
2007	The Walker	Yes	Yes	
2008	Adam Resurrected	Yes	No	
2013	The Canyons	Yes	No	
2014	Dying of the Light	Yes	Yes	
2016	Dog Eat Dog	Yes	No	Role: Grecco the Greek
2017	First Reformed	Yes	Yes	Nominated - Academy Award for Best Original Screenplay
2021	The Card Counter	Yes	Yes	
2022	There Are No Saints	No	Yes	Also executive producer
2022	Master Gardener	Yes	Yes	
2024	Oh, Canada	Yes	Yes	
2026	The Basics of Philosophy	Yes	Yes	

=== Unproduced projects ===
- Pipeliner (1971)
- Québecois! (1973)
- The Gambler (1973)
- Kingdom Come (1974)
- The Havana Colony (1975)
- Eight Scenes from the Life of Hank Williams (1976)
- Not So Long Ago (1976)
- Zen and the Art of Motorcycle Maintenance (1976)
- Covert People (1979)
- Gershwin (1985)
- The Bad and the Beautiful remake (1986)
- Investigation (1986)
- The Bobby Darin Story (late 1980s)
- By the Sea of Crystal (alternatively titled The Christian Life) (1992–99)
- Dino (1998)
- The Distributor (2000)
- The Doors of Perception (2000)
- The Fugue (2003)
- Tokyo Underworld (2009)
- Xtreme City (2009)
- Bait (2011)
- Recall (2011)
- Untitled Matilda Kshesinskaya biopic (2012)
- The Devil's Right Hand (2013)
- Untitled Clarence Thomas biopic (2013)
- Life on the Other Side (2014)
- Don't Shoot the Piano Player (2016)
- Nine Men from Now (2019)
- The Apostles and Apocrypha (2021)
- Three Guns at Dawn (2022)
- R.N. (2022)
- Non Compos Mentis (2024)
- Untitled Frank Sinatra biopic (2024)

=== Music video ===
Year	Title	Artist
1985	"Tight Connection to My Heart (Has Anybody Seen My Love)"	Bob Dylan

=== Documentary appearances ===
- A Decade Under the Influence (2003)
- Easy Riders, Raging Bulls: How the Sex, Drugs and Rock 'N' Roll Generation Saved Hollywood (2003)
- Erika Rabau: Puck of Berlin (2008)
- Tales from the Script (2009)
- These Amazing Shadows (2011)
- Eames: The Architect and the Painter (2011)
- The Story of Film (2011)
- Milius (2013)
- Richard Pryor: Omit the Logic (2013)
- Hitchcock/Truffaut (2015)
- What She Said: The Art of Pauline Kael (2018)

== Theatre ==
Year	Title
1987	Berlinale
2004	The Cleopatra Club

== Awards and nominations ==
=== Won ===
- 1976 – National Board of Review, Top 10 Films of the Year for Obsession
- 1977 – National Society of Film Critics Awards, Best Film (2nd Place) for Taxi Driver
- 1980 – Los Angeles Film Critics Association Awards, Best Picture for Raging Bull
- 1980 – National Board of Review, Top 10 Films of the Year for Raging Bull
- 1980 – New York Film Critics Circle Awards, Best Film (3rd Place) for Raging Bull
- 1981 – National Society of Film Critics Awards, Best Film (2nd Place) for Raging Bull (tied with Every Man for Himself)
- 1981 – Boston Society of Film Critics Awards, Best Film for Raging Bull
- 1985 – Cannes Film Festival, Best Artistic Film Contribution for Mishima: A Life in Four Chapters
- 1990 – National Film Preservation Board, National Film Registry for Raging Bull
- 1993 – New York Film Critics Circle Awards, Best Film (3rd Place) for Light Sleeper
- 1994 – National Film Preservation Board, National Film Registry for Taxi Driver
- 1997 – Valladolid International Film Festival, Youth Jury Award – Special Mention for Affliction
- 1998 – Taos Talking Picture Festival, Storyteller Award
- 1998 – New York Film Critics Circle Awards, Best Film (2nd Place) for Affliction
- 1999 – National Society of Film Critics Awards, Best Film (2nd Place) for Affliction
- 1999 – Golden Trailer Awards, Best in Show for Bringing Out the Dead
- 1999 – Writers Guild of America, Laurel Award for Screen Writing Achievement
- 2005 – American Film Institute, Franklin J. Schaffner Award
- 2007 – Stockholm International Film Festival, Lifetime Achievement Award
- 2008 – St. Louis International Film Festival, Lifetime Achievement Award
- 2009 – Cinemanila International Film Festival, Lifetime Achievement Award
- 2013 – Melbourne Underground Film Festival, Best Foreign Director for The Canyons
- 2013 – Melbourne Underground Film Festival, Best Foreign Film for The Canyons
- 2013 – Ghent International Film Festival, Joseph Plateau Honorary Award
- 2013 – Valladolid International Film Festival, Honorary Spike for The Canyons
- 2018 – Gotham Independent Film Award, Best Screenplay for First Reformed
- 2018 – National Board of Review, Best Original Screenplay for First Reformed
- 2018 – New York Film Critics Circle Awards, Best Screenplay for First Reformed
- 2021 – Zurich Film Festival, Lifetime Achievement Award
- 2022 – Venice Film Festival, Golden Lion Honorary Award

=== Nominated ===
- 1977 – Golden Globes, Best Screenplay – Motion Picture for Taxi Driver
- 1977 – Writers Guild of America Award, Best Original Screenplay for Taxi Driver
- 1977 – Academy of Science Fiction, Fantasy & Horror Films, USA, Golden Scroll – Best Horror Film for Obsession
- 1979 – Berlin International Film Festival, Golden Berlin Bear for Hardcore
- 1981 – Golden Globes, Best Screenplay – Motion Picture for Raging Bull (shared with Mardik Martin)
- 1985 – Cannes Film Festival, Palme d'Or for Mishima: A Life in Four Chapters
- 1988 – Cannes Film Festival, Palme d'Or for Patty Hearst
- 1988 – National Board of Review, Top 10 Films of the Year for The Last Temptation of Christ
- 1989 – Political Film Society, PFS Award – Exposé for Patty Hearst
- 1992 – Berlin International Film Festival, Golden Berlin Bear for Light Sleeper
- 1992 – Deauville Film Festival, Critics Award for Light Sleeper
- 1993 – Independent Spirit Awards, Best Screenplay for Light Sleeper
- 1993 – Mystfest, Best Film for Light Sleeper
- 1995 – Academy of Science Fiction, Fantasy & Horror Films, Saturn Award – Best Single Genre Television Presentation for Witch Hunt
- 1997 – Sitges - Catalan International Film Festival, Best Film for Touch
- 1997 – Valladolid International Film Festival, Golden Spike for Affliction
- 1998 – Independent Spirit Awards, Best Screenplay for Touch
- 1998 – Independent Spirit Awards, Best Director for Touch
- 1999 – Independent Spirit Awards, Best Screenplay for Affliction
- 1999 – Independent Spirit Awards, Best Director for Affliction
- 2002 – San Sebastián International Film Festival, Golden Seashell for Auto Focus
- 2003 – Golden Trailer Awards, Trashiest Trailer for Auto Focus
- 2005 – Golden Raspberry Awards, Worst Director for Dominion: Prequel to The Exorcist
- 2018 – Independent Spirit Awards, Best Screenplay for First Reformed
- 2018 – Independent Spirit Awards, Best Director for First Reformed
- 2019 – Academy Awards, Best Original Screenplay for First Reformed

== Bibliography ==
- First Reformed, Archway Editions, 2023 (ISBN 1-576-87974-0).
- Transcendental Style in Film: Ozu, Bresson, Dreyer, Da Capo Press, 1988 (ISBN 0-306-80335-6).
- Notes on Film Noir, Film Comment, Vol. 8, No. 1, Spring 1972.
