= Library of Congress Prize for American Fiction =

Library of Congress Prize for American Fiction (formerly the Library of Congress Creative Achievement Award for Fiction and Library of Congress Lifetime Achievement Award for the Writing of Fiction) is an annual book award presented by the Librarian of Congress each year at the National Book Festival.

It was established in 2009 as a lifetime achievement award, although the first award was presented in 2008. In 2008, the Library of Congress was inspired to award Herman Wouk with a lifetime achievement award in the writing of fiction. That honor inspired the Library to grant subsequent fiction-writing awards, beginning with the Library of Congress Creative Achievement Award for Fiction from 2009–2012. Beginning in 2013, the award was renamed to the Library of Congress Prize for American Fiction.

== Honorees ==
As the Library of Congress Lifetime Achievement Award for the Writing of Fiction

- 2008 Herman Wouk

As the Library of Congress Creative Achievement Award for Fiction

- 2009 John Grisham
- 2010 Isabel Allende
- 2011 Toni Morrison
- 2012 Philip Roth

As the Library of Congress Prize for American Fiction

- 2013 Don DeLillo
- 2014 E. L. Doctorow
- 2015 Louise Erdrich
- 2016 Marilynne Robinson
- 2017 Denis Johnson
- 2018 Annie Proulx
- 2019 Richard Ford
- 2020 Colson Whitehead
- 2021 Joy Williams
- 2022 Jesmyn Ward
- 2023 George Saunders
- 2024 James McBride
- 2025 Geraldine Brooks
- 2026 Ann Patchett
