= Lila (Robinson novel) =

2014 novel by Marilynne Robinson

- Author: Marilynne Robinson
- Language: English
- Genre: Novel
- Publisher: Farrar, Straus & Giroux
- Publication date: October 7, 2014
- Publication place: United States
- Media type: hardcover, paperback, e-book, audiobook
- Pages: 272 pp
- ISBN: 0374187614
- Preceded by: Gilead, Home
- Followed by: Jack

Lila is a novel written by Marilynne Robinson that was published in 2014. Her fourth novel, it is the third installment of the Gilead series, after Gilead and Home. The novel focuses on the courtship and marriage of Lila and John Ames, as well as the story of Lila's transient past and her complex attachments. It won the 2014 National Book Critics Circle Award.

== Reception ==
In a review for The Atlantic Leslie Jamison praised the novel as "brilliant and deeply affecting." In another review, Sarah Churchwell wrote, "Lila... offers Robinson's characteristic delights: glorious prose, subtle wisdom and a darkly numinous atmosphere, lit at moments by a visionary wonder shading into exaltation."

In Books and Culture, Linda Moore offered "a dissenting view", critiquing the Christianity that Robinson writes about as "gospel thin, exiguous, a story slight and wanting, and Flannery isn't here to say so."

== Awards ==
- 2014 National Book Critics Circle Award (Fiction)
