= Mother Country: Britain, the Welfare State, and Nuclear Pollution =

1989 nonfiction book by Marilynne Robinson

- First edition
- Author: Marilynne Robinson
- Language: English
- Genre: Nonfiction
- Publisher: FSG
- Publication date: 1989
- Publication place: United States
- Media type: Print (hardback & paperback)
- Pages: 272
- ISBN: 978-0-374-21361-9

Mother Country: Britain, the Welfare State, and Nuclear Pollution (1989) is a work of nonfiction by Marilynne Robinson that tells an alleged story of Sellafield, a government nuclear reprocessing plant located on the coast of the Irish Sea. The book claims that the closest village to Sellafield suffers from death and disease due to decades of waste and radiation from the plant. Mother Country was a National Book Award finalist for Nonfiction in 1989. While on sabbatical in England, Robinson's interest in the environmental ramifications of the plant began when she discovered a newspaper article detailing its hazards.

Max Perutz, a British Nobel Prize-winning scientist, wrote a scathing review which attacked both the claimed facts and the methodologies used in assembling the arguments presented by Robinson.
