= Jack (Robinson novel) =

Novel by Marilynne Robinson

- First edition cover
- Author: Marilynne Robinson
- Audio read by: Adam Verner
- Language: English
- Set in: St. Louis, Missouri
- Publisher: Farrar, Straus and Giroux
- Publication date: September 29, 2020
- Publication place: United States
- Media type: Print (hardcover), e-book, audio
- Pages: 320
- ISBN: 978-0-374-27930-1 (hardcover)
- OCLC: 1136958758
- Dewey Decimal: 813/.54
- LC Class: PS3568.O3125 J33 2020
- Preceded by: Lila

Jack is a novel by Marilynne Robinson, published on September 29, 2020, by Farrar, Straus and Giroux.

It is Robinson's fifth novel and her fourth in the Gilead sequence, preceded by Gilead (2004), Home (2008), and Lila (2014). It focuses on John Ames "Jack" Boughton, the troubled son of Robert Boughton. He was named after Robert's friend Reverend John Ames, the subject of Gilead (2004). It tells the story of the courtship of Della Miles and Jack Boughton, an interracial couple in post-World War II St. Louis, Missouri. It is a third-person narrative, but is more closely aligned with Jack's psyche.

== Reception ==
In its starred review, Publishers Weekly praised the novel's dialogue and Robinson's "masterly prose and musings on faith."

In its starred review, Kirkus Reviews called the novel an "elegantly written proof of the thesis that love conquers all—but not without considerable pain."

Writing for The New York Times Book Review, Elaine Showalter praised Jack's dialogue for "winningly" representing his "redemption and development, his sensitivity and sardonic humor."

Ron Charles of The Washington Post criticized the novel's "asymmetrical" focus on Jack for diminishing Della's character.

Claire Lowdon of The Times felt the novel was the weakest in the Gilead series, criticizing its dialogue for being "burdened with too much of the philosophical and theological debate."

The novel was longlisted for the Andrew Carnegie Medal for Excellence in Fiction.

== Film adaptation ==
In October 2023, Martin Scorsese announced intentions to adapt Jack into a feature film.
