= Housekeeping (novel) =

1980 novel by Marilynne Robinson

- First edition cover
- Author: Marilynne Robinson
- Language: English
- Published: 1980 Farrar, Straus and Giroux
- Publication place: United States
- Media type: Print (hard & paperback)
- Pages: 219 pp
- ISBN: 0-374-17313-3
- OCLC: 6602826
- Dewey Decimal: 813/.54 19
- LC Class: PS3568.O3125 H6 1980

Housekeeping is a 1980 novel by Marilynne Robinson. The novel was a finalist for the Pulitzer Prize for Fiction and awarded the PEN/Hemingway Award for best first novel.

In 2003, and again in 2026, Guardian Unlimited named Housekeeping one of the 100 greatest novels of all time, describing the book as "Haunting, poetic story, drowned in water and light, about three generations of women." Time magazine also included the novel in its Time 100 Best English-language Novels from 1923 to 2005.

== Plot ==
Ruthie narrates the story of how she and her younger sister Lucille are raised by a succession of relatives in the fictional town of Fingerbone, Idaho, after their mother Helen Stone leaves them with her mother Sylvie Foster and then dies by suicide. Early in the novel a passenger train plunges from a trestle bridge into a lake.

Fingerbone somewhat resembles Robinson's hometown, Sandpoint, Idaho, particularly the presence of a major rail bridge, which crosses Lake Pend Oreille, and has direct rail links to Spokane and Montana. The lake is Idaho's largest, 43-mile-long (69-kilometer), and Sandpoint lies on the lake's shore, as does Fingerbone.

The two children are first raised by their grandmother Sylvie Foster and then by her sisters-in-law, Lily and Nona Foster. Eventually their aunt Sylvie Fisher, who has been living as a transient, comes to take care of them. At first the three are a close-knit group, but as Lucille grows up she comes to dislike their eccentric life-style and moves out to live with Miss Royce, her home economics teacher. When Ruthie's well-being is questioned by the courts, Sylvie returns to life on the road and takes Ruthie with her.

The novel explores the subject of housekeeping, not only in the domestic sense of cleaning, but in the larger sense of keeping a spiritual home for one's self and family in the face of loss.

The novel is narrated by Ruth from the perspective of the transparent eyeball. This narration style was used by the transcendentalist authors who influenced Robinson, including Ralph Waldo Emerson.

== Time period ==
Although no dates are specified, the novel likely takes place in the 1950s: Ruthie reads the novel Not as a Stranger, a bestseller from 1954; and Sylvie's husband "fought in the Pacific." Like Ruthie and Lucille, Robinson (born in 1943) was an adolescent in the late 1950s.

Presumably, the three Foster sisters were born in the late 1910s (as Sylvie is in her mid-thirties when the main plot begins) and the train accident occurred around 1930 (as the three sisters were in their early teens at that time). The train accident in the novel bears many similarities to the Custer Creek train wreck of 1938, in which a passenger train derailed from a bridge into a creek in Montana, killing 47 people. It remains the state's worst-ever rail disaster.

== Characters ==
=== Foster family: Younger generation ===
- Ruth "Ruthie" Stone – the narrator of the story. She shares a name with the Biblical Ruth, who also accompanied an older female relative (her mother-in-law, Naomi) on a journey.
- Lucille Stone – Ruth's younger sister, who comes to crave a more stable life.

=== Foster family: Middle generation ===
- Molly Foster – the oldest of the three Foster sisters, who leaves Fingerbone to do missionary work as a bookkeeper in "Honan Province" in China.
- Helen Stone (née Foster) – the middle of the three Foster sisters. She is the mother of Ruthie and Lucille. After her marriage, she moves to Seattle with her husband, and returns to Fingerbone several years later to commit suicide. Sylvie says that Helen was not close to her father.
- Reginald Stone - Helen's husband and the father of Ruthie and Lucille, who disappears from their lives at a young age. He works as a salesman, selling "some sort of farming equipment."
- Sylvie Fisher (née Foster) – the youngest of the three Foster sisters, who comes to Fingerbone to take care of Ruthie and Lucille after the death of her mother/their grandmother. She is "about thirty-five" when she returns to Fingerbone.
- Mr. Fisher - Sylvie's husband, who repaired motors in the Pacific Theater of the Second World War. His first name is never revealed.

=== Foster family: Older generation ===
- Sylvia Foster – Ruth and Lucille's grandmother and the mother of Molly, Helen, and Sylvie. Sylvia lived her entire life in Fingerbone, accepted the basic religious dogma of an afterlife, and lived her life accordingly.
- Edmund Foster – Ruth and Lucille's grandfather, Sylvia's husband, and Molly, Helen, and Sylvie's father ("papa"). He was raised in a house dug out of the ground in the "Middle West." He is consumed with wanderlust and a desire to paint mountains. This desire leads to his job on a train and the related events form the foundation of the novel. Working on the train, he is killed in its crash into the lake of Fingerbone.
- Lily and Nona Foster – Sylvia Foster's sisters-in-law (i.e., Edmund's sisters), who moved from the Midwest to Spokane, to be closer to their brother. After Sylvia's death, they temporarily move from Spokane to Fingerbone to take care of Ruthie and Lucille. When this becomes too difficult, they summon Sylvie.

=== Other characters ===
- Bernice – a friend of Helen's who lived below Ruthie, Lucille, and Helen, when they lived in Seattle. Bernice worked in a truck stop. She urged Helen to visit her estranged mother, even lending Helen her car (the same car that Helen drives over the cliff into the lake).
- Ettie – a friend of Ruthie's grandmother, Sylvia Foster. A tiny old lady, whose skin was the color of toadstools.
- The Sheriff of Fingerbone - an older man (he is a grandfather) who has served as the town sheriff for decades. Although he has dealt with many murders and other violent crimes, he is uncertain how to deal with Sylvie's apparent neglect of Ruth and Lucille. Eventually he informs Sylvie that there will be a hearing regarding Ruth's future.
- Mr. French - the principal of Ruth and Lucille's school. He becomes concerned by their truancy.
- Miss Royce - the home economics teacher at Ruth and Lucille's school. Lucille eventually moves in with her.
- Miss Knoll - Ruth's teacher

== Film adaptation ==
The film adaptation Housekeeping was released in 1987. It stars Christine Lahti and was directed by Bill Forsyth. The film was shot in and around Nelson, British Columbia.
