= Home (Robinson novel) =

2008 novel by Marilynne Robinson

- Cover of the first edition
- Author: Marilynne Robinson
- Language: English
- Genre: Literary fiction
- Publisher: Farrar, Straus and Giroux
- Publication date: September 2, 2008
- Publication place: United States
- Media type: Print (hardcover, paperback), audiobook
- Pages: 325 pp
- Awards: LAT Prize – Fiction (2008); Orange Prize (2009)
- ISBN: 9780374299101 (hardcover 1st ed.)
- OCLC: 213300725
- Dewey Decimal: 813/.54
- LC Class: PS3568.O3125 H58 2008
- Preceded by: Gilead
- Followed by: Lila

Home is a novel by Pulitzer Prize-winning American author Marilynne Robinson. Published in 2008, it is Robinson's third novel, preceded by Housekeeping (1980) and Gilead (2004).

== Plot ==
The novel chronicles the life of the Boughton family, specifically the father, Reverend Robert Boughton, and Glory and Jack, two of Robert's adult children who return home to Gilead, Iowa. A companion to Gilead, Home is an independent novel that takes place concurrently and examines some of the same events from a different angle.

== Reception ==
Home was named one of the "100 Notable Books of 2008" by The New York Times, one of the "Best Books of 2008" by The Washington Post, one of the Los Angeles Times' "Favorite Books 2008", one of the "Best Books of 2008" by San Francisco Chronicle, as well as one of The New Yorker book critic James Wood's ten favorite books of 2008.

The novel won the 2008 Los Angeles Times Book Prize for Fiction and the 2009 Orange Prize for Fiction and was a finalist for the 2008 National Book Award for Fiction.

== Film adaptation ==
In September 2023, Martin Scorsese announced intentions to adapt Home as a feature film. Scorsese and Todd Field finished a draft of the script before the WGA strike commenced, with Kent Jones. In March 2025, it was announced that he would be adapting Robinson's book for Apple TV+ with Leonardo DiCaprio starring.
