= Marilynne Robinson =

American novelist and essayist (born 1943)

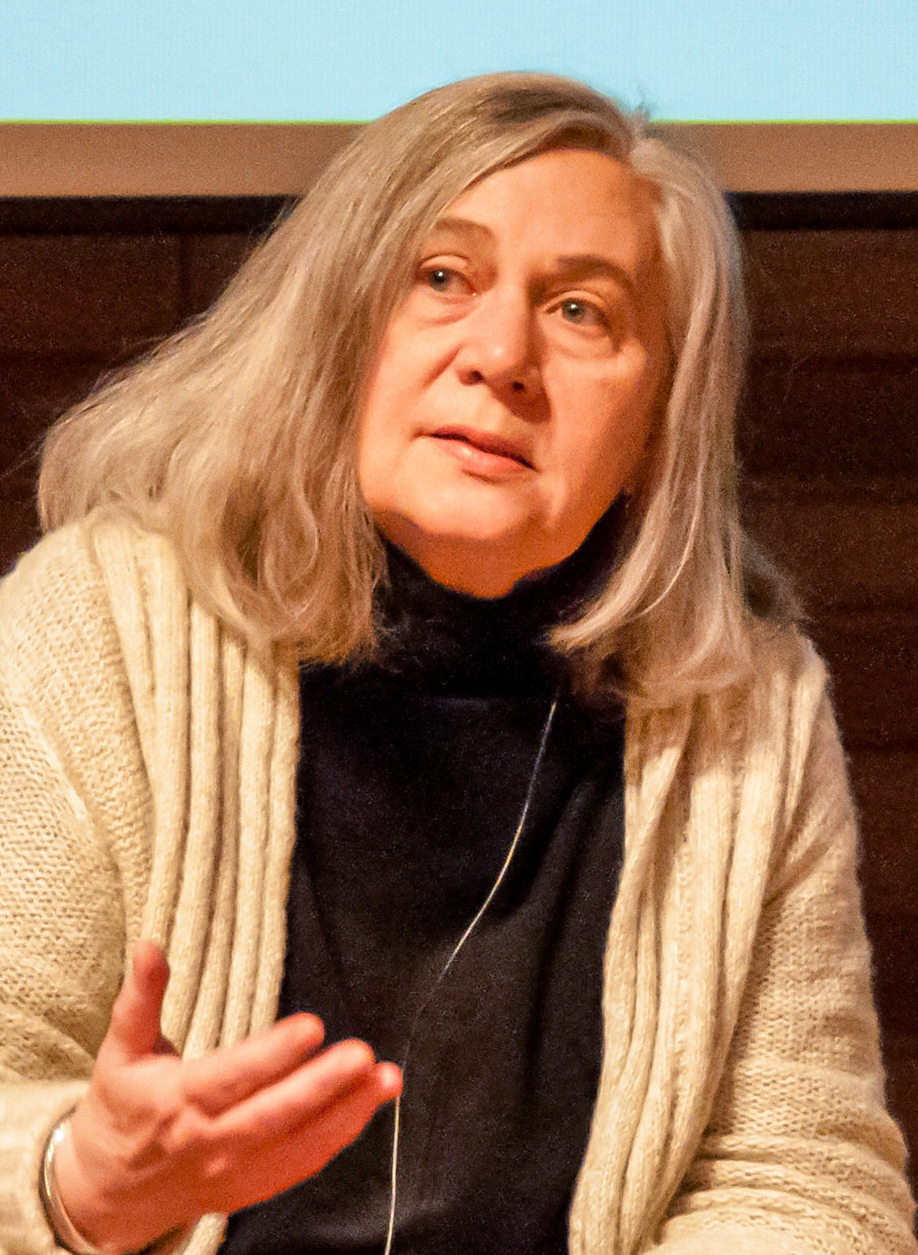
- Robinson in 2012
- Born: Marilynne Summers; November 26, 1943 (age 82); Sandpoint, Idaho, U.S.
- Education: Brown University (BA); University of Washington (MA, PhD)
- Occupations: Novelist; essayist
- Spouse: Fred Robinson (m. 1967; div. 1989)
- Children: 2
- Writing career
- Notable awards: Hemingway Foundation/PEN Award (1981); National Book Critics Circle Award for Fiction (2004, 2014); Pulitzer Prize for Fiction (2005); Orange Prize for Fiction (2009); National Humanities Medal (2012); Library of Congress Prize for American Fiction (2016)

Marilynne Summers Robinson (born November 26, 1943) is an American novelist and essayist. Across her writing career, Robinson has received numerous awards, including the Pulitzer Prize for Fiction in 2005, National Humanities Medal in 2012, and the 2016 Library of Congress Prize for American Fiction. In 2016, Robinson was named in Time magazine's list of 100 most influential people. Robinson began teaching at the Iowa Writers' Workshop in 1991 and retired in the spring of 2016.

Robinson is best known for her novels Housekeeping (1980) and Gilead (2004). Her novels are noted for their thematic depiction of faith and rural life. The subjects of her essays span numerous topics, including the relationship between religion and science, American history, nuclear pollution, John Calvin, and contemporary American politics.

== Early life and education ==
Robinson was born Marilynne Summers on November 26, 1943, in Sandpoint, Idaho, the daughter of Ellen (Harris) and John J. Summers, a lumber company employee. Her brother is the art historian David Summers, who dedicated his book Vision, Reflection, and Desire in Western Painting to her. Robinson was raised in Coeur d'Alene, Idaho, where she graduated high school.

She did her undergraduate work at Pembroke College, the former women's college at Brown University, receiving her BA magna cum laude in 1966, and being elected to Phi Beta Kappa. At Brown, one of her teachers was the postmodern novelist John Hawkes. She received her PhD in English from the University of Washington in 1977.

== Writing career ==
Robinson has written five highly acclaimed novels: Housekeeping (1980), Gilead (2004), Home (2008), Lila (2014), and Jack (2020). Housekeeping was a finalist for the 1982 Pulitzer Prize for Fiction (US), Gilead was awarded the 2005 Pulitzer, and Home received the 2009 Orange Prize for Fiction (UK). Home, Lila, and Jack are companions to Gilead and focus on the Boughton and Ames families during the same time period.

Robinson is also the author of many nonfiction works, including Mother Country: Britain, the Welfare State, and Nuclear Pollution (1989), The Death of Adam: Essays on Modern Thought (1998), Absence of Mind: The Dispelling of Inwardness from the Modern Myth of the Self (2010), When I Was a Child I Read Books: Essays (2012), The Givenness of Things: Essays (2015), and What Are We Doing Here? (2018). Reading Genesis was released on March 12, 2024. Her novels and nonfiction works have been translated into 36 languages.

She has written numerous articles, essays and reviews for Harper's, The Paris Review, and The New York Review of Books.

== Academic affiliations ==
In addition to her tenure from 1991 to 2016 on the faculty of the University of Iowa, where she retired as the F. Wendell Miller Professor of English and Creative Writing, Robinson has been writer-in-residence or visiting professor at many colleges and universities, including Amherst College, and the University of Massachusetts Amherst's MFA Program for Poets and Writers.

In 2009, she held a Dwight H. Terry Lectureship at Yale University, where she delivered a series of talks titled Absence of Mind: The Dispelling of Inwardness from the Modern Myth of the Self. In May 2011, Robinson delivered the University of Oxford's annual Esmond Harmsworth Lecture in American Arts and Letters at the university's Rothermere American Institute. On April 19, 2010, she was elected a fellow of the American Academy of Arts and Sciences. Robinson was selected by the Faculty of Divinity at Cambridge University to deliver the 2018 Hulsean Lectures on Christian theology. She was the fourth woman selected for the series which was established in 1790. She has been elected a fellow of Mansfield College, Oxford and of Clare Hall, Cambridge. In 2023, Robinson received the Alumnus Summa Laude Dignatus from the University of Washington, the highest honor bestowed upon a graduate of the university.

The Yale Collection of American Literature at the Beinecke Rare Book and Manuscript Library has acquired her papers.

== Honors and awards ==
Robinson has received numerous literary, theological and academic honors, among them the 2006 Louisville Grawemeyer Award in Religion, the 2013 Park Kyong-ni Prize, and the 2016 Richard C. Holbrooke Distinguished Achievement Award. In 2021, the Tulsa Library Trust presented her with the Helmerich Distinguished Author Award. Robinson's alma mater, the University of Washington, honored her with their 2022 Alumni Summa Laude Dignata Award.

Robinson has received honorary degrees from over a dozen universities and colleges, starting with Oxford University in 2010 and Brown University in 2012, and followed most recently by the University of Iowa, Yale University, Boston College, Cambridge University, and the University of Portland.

== Commendations ==
The former Archbishop of Canterbury, Rowan Williams, has described Robinson as "one of the world's most compelling English-speaking novelists", adding that "Robinson's is a voice we urgently need to attend to in both Church and society here [in the UK]."

On June 26, 2015, President Barack Obama quoted Robinson in his eulogy for Clementa C. Pinckney of Emanuel African Methodist Episcopal Church in Charleston, South Carolina. In speaking about "an open heart," Obama said: "[w]hat a friend of mine, the writer Marilynne Robinson, calls 'that reservoir of goodness, beyond, and of another kind, that we are able to do each other in the ordinary cause of things.'" In November 2015, The New York Review of Books published a two-part conversation between Obama and Robinson, covering topics in American history and the role of faith in society.

== Personal life ==
Robinson was raised as a Presbyterian and later became a Congregationalist, worshipping and sometimes preaching at the Congregational United Church of Christ in Iowa City. Her Congregationalism and her interest in the ideas of John Calvin have been important in many of her novels, including Gilead, which centers on the life and theological concerns of a fictional Congregationalist minister. In an interview with the Church Times in 2012, Robinson said: "I think, if people actually read Calvin, rather than read Max Weber, he would be rebranded. He is a very respectable thinker."

In 1967 she married Fred Miller Robinson, a writer and professor at the University of Massachusetts Amherst. The Robinsons divorced in 1989. The couple have two sons. In the late 1970s, she wrote Housekeeping in the evenings while they slept. Robinson said they influenced her writing in many ways, since "[Motherhood] changes your sense of life, your sense of yourself."

Robinson divides her time between northern California and upstate New York.

== Bibliography ==
=== Novels ===
- —— (1980). Housekeeping. Farrar, Straus and Giroux. ISBN 9780374525187.
- —— (2004). Gilead. Farrar, Straus and Giroux. ISBN 9780312424404.
- —— (2008). Home. Farrar, Straus and Giroux. ISBN 9780009732997.
- —— (2014). Lila. Farrar, Straus and Giroux. ISBN 9781844088812.
- —— (2020). Jack. Farrar, Straus and Giroux. ISBN 9780374279301.

==== Short fiction ====
- "Connie Bronson" in The Paris Review, 1986
- "Kansas" in The New Yorker on September 6, 2004 (Extract from Gilead)
- "Jack and Della" in The New Yorker on July 13, 2020 (Extract from Jack)

=== Nonfiction ===
==== Books ====
- —— (1989). Mother Country: Britain, the Welfare State, and Nuclear Pollution. Farrar, Straus and Giroux. ISBN 9780374526597.
- —— (1998). The Death of Adam: Essays on Modern Thought. Picador. ISBN 9780312425326.
- —— (2010). Absence of Mind: The Dispelling of Inwardness from the Modern Myth of the Self. Yale University Press. ISBN 9780300171471.
- —— (2012). When I Was a Child I Read Books. Farrar, Straus and Giroux. ISBN 9780374298784.
- —— (2015). The Givenness of Things: Essays. Farrar, Straus and Giroux. ISBN 9781250097316.
- —— (2018). What Are We Doing Here?: Essays. Farrar, Straus and Giroux. ISBN 9780374282219.
- —— (2024). Reading Genesis. Abacus. ISBN 9780349018744.

==== Essays and reportage ====
- "Bad News From Britain: Dangerous Chemicals, Awful Silence", Harper's Magazine, February, 1985
- "A Great Amnesia", Harper's Magazine, May 2008
- "On 'Beauty'". Tin House. 50. Winter 2011.
- "On Edgar Allan Poe", The New York Review of Books, vol. LXII, no. 2 (February 5, 2015), pp. 4, 6.
- "Humanism, Science, and the Radical Expansion of the Possible". The Nation. November 2015. Archived from the original on 2019-10-25.
- "Fear". New York Review of Books. 62 (14). Fall 2015.
- "Save Our Public Universities", Harper's Magazine, March, 2016
- "Which Way to the City on a Hill?". New York Review of Books. 66 (12). Summer 2019.
- "Is Poverty Necessary?", Harper's Magazine, June, 2019
- "What Kind of Country Do We Want?". New York Review of Books. 67 (10). June 11, 2020.
- "What Does It Mean to Love a Country? (online: Don't Give Up on America)". The New York Times. October 9, 2020.
- The Gun-violence Plague is Evolving, Dangerously, The Washington Post, June 17, 2022
- One Manner of Law, Harper's Magazine, July, 2022
- Glories Stream from Heaven Afar, New York Review of Books, December 25, 2022
- Dismantling Iowa, New York Review of Books, November 2, 2023
- "And It Was So: Creation in Genesis", Harper's Magazine, February, 2024
- "Notes from An Occupation," New York Review of Books, June 26, 2025

==== Interviews ====
- "Marilynne Robinson: The Art of Fiction, No. 198", The Paris Review, Fall 2008.
- A September 2015 interview with Barack Obama in Des Moines, Iowa, recorded by the New York Review of Books and published in the October issues of the magazine in two parts
- "Marilynne Robinson on Biblical Beauty, Human Evil and the Idea of Israel", The Ezra Klein Show, March 5, 2024
- "American Believer" on Open Source with Christopher Lydon, August 1, 2024
- "Occupied America" on Open Source with Christopher Lydon, July 10, 2025

== Awards ==
- 1982: PEN/Hemingway Award for Debut Novel for Housekeeping
- 1982: Pulitzer Prize for Fiction shortlist for Housekeeping
- 1989: National Book Award for Nonfiction shortlist for Mother Country: Britain, the Welfare State, and Nuclear Pollution
- 1999: PEN/Diamonstein-Spielvogel Award for the Art of the Essay for The Death of Adam
- 2004: National Book Critics Circle Award for Fiction for Gilead
- 2005: Ambassador Book Award for Gilead
- 2005: Chicago Tribune Heartland Prize for Gilead
- 2005: Pulitzer Prize for Fiction for Gilead
- 2006: University of Louisville Grawemeyer Award in Religion
- 2008: National Book Award for Fiction finalist for Home
- 2008: Los Angeles Times Book Prize for Fiction for Home
- 2009: Orange Prize for Fiction for Home
- 2011: Man Booker International Prize nominee
- 2012: Honorary Doctorate of Letters from Brown University
- 2012: National Humanities Medal for "grace and intelligence in writing"
- 2013: Man Booker International Prize nominee
- 2013: Park Kyong-ni Prize
- 2014: National Book Critics Circle Award for Lila
- 2014: National Book Award finalist for Lila
- 2015: Man Booker Prize longlist for Lila
- 2016: Library of Congress Prize for American Fiction and Dayton Literary Peace Prize
- 2016: Premio Autore Straniero (Foreign Author Award), Il Premio Letterario Internazionale Mondello
- 2017: Chicago Tribune Literary Award
- 2019: Newberry Library Award
- 2021: Tulsa Library Trust Helmerich Distinguished Author Award
- 2023: University of Washington Alumni Summa Laude Dignata Award

== Honorary degrees ==
- 2007: Amherst College
- 2010: Skidmore College
- 2011: College of the Holy Cross
- 2011: University of Oxford
- 2012: Brown University
- 2013: Sewanee: The University of the South
- 2013: University of Notre Dame
- 2015: Liverpool Hope University
- 2016: Lund University
- 2017: Duke University
- 2017: University of Iowa
- 2018: Yale University
- 2019: Boston College
- 2019: University of Cambridge
- 2019: University of Portland
- 2024: Free University of Amsterdam
