= Writers Guild of America Award for Television: Dramatic Series =

Annual television award

- Awarded for: Outstanding Writing for a Dramatic Series
- Country: United States
- Presented by: Writers Guild of America
- First award: 2006
- Currently held by: The Pitt (2025)
- Website: http://www.wga.org/

The Writers Guild of America Award for Television: Dramatic Series is an award presented by the Writers Guild of America to the writers of the best dramatic television series of the season. It has been awarded since the 58th Annual Writers Guild of America Awards in 2006. The year indicates when each season aired. The winners are highlighted in gold.

== Winners and nominees ==
=== 2000s ===
Year	Program	Writer(s)	Network
2005 (58th)
2005 (58th)	Lost	J. J. Abrams, Kim Clements, Carlton Cuse, Leonard Dick, Paul Dini, Brent Fletcher, David Fury, Drew Goddard, Javier Grillo-Marxuach, Adam Horowitz, Jennifer M. Johnson, Christina M. Kim, Edward Kitsis, Jeffrey Lieber, Damon Lindelof, Lynne E. Litt, Monica Macer, Steven Maeda, Elizabeth Sarnoff, Janet Tamaro, Christian Taylor, Craig Wright	ABC
2005 (58th)	Deadwood	Regina Corrado, Sara Hess, Ted Mann, Bryan McDonald, Bernadette McNamara, David Milch, Victoria Morrow, Peter Ocko, Elizabeth Sarnoff, Steve Shill, Nick Towne, Jody Worth	HBO
2005 (58th)	Six Feet Under	Alan Ball, Scott R. Buck, Rick Cleveland, Bruce Eric Kaplan, Nancy Oliver, Katherine Robin, Jill Soloway, Craig Wright	HBO
2005 (58th)	Grey's Anatomy	Zoanne A. Clack, Ann Lewis Hamilton, Kip Koenig, Stacy McKee, James Parriott, Tony Phelan, Joan Rater, Shonda Rhimes, Mimi Schmir, Gabrielle Stanton, Krista Vernoff, Harry Werksman	ABC
2005 (58th)	The West Wing	Eli G. Attie, Debora T. Cahn, Carol Flint, Mark Goffman, Alex Graves, Peter R. Noah, Lawrence O'Donnell Jr., Lauren E. Schmidt, Josh Singer, Aaron Sorkin, John Wells, Bradley Whitford, John Sacret Young	NBC
2006 (59th)
2006 (59th)	The Sopranos	Mitchell Burgess, David Chase, Diane Frolov, Robin Green, Andrew Schneider, Matthew Weiner, Terence Winter	HBO
2006 (59th)	24	Robert Cochran, Manny Coto, Athan A. Demetrius, David Ehrman, David Fury, Howard Gordon, Evan Katz, Stephen Kronish, Michael Loceff, Matt Michnovetz, Steve Mitchell, Sam Montgomery, Nicole Ranadive, Joel Surnow, Craig W. Van Sickle	Fox
2006 (59th)	Deadwood	W. Earl Brown, Regina Corrado, Alix Lambert, Ted Mann, Bernadette McNamara, David Milch, Kem Nunn, Nick Towne, Zack Whedon	HBO
2006 (59th)	Grey's Anatomy	Debora Cahn, Zoanne A. Clack, Allan Heinberg, Elizabeth Klaviter, Kip Koenig, Stacy McKee, Carolina Paiz, James Parriott, Tony Phelan, Joan Rater, Shonda Rhimes, Blythe Robe, Mimi Schmir, Gabrielle Stanton, Krista Vernoff, Harry Werksman, Mark Wilding	ABC
2006 (59th)	Lost	J. J. Abrams, Monica Owusu-Breen, Carlton Cuse, Leonard Dick, Drew Goddard, Javier J. Grillo-Marxuach, Adam Horowitz, Dawn Lambertsen-Kelly, Christina M. Kim, Edward Kitsis, Damon L. Lindelof, Steven Maeda, Jeff Pinkner, Matt Ragghianti, Elizabeth Sarnoff, Alison Schapker	ABC
2007 (60th)
2007 (60th)	The Wire	Ed Burns, Chris Collins, Dennis Lehane, David Mills, George Pelecanos, Richard Price, David Simon, William F. Zorzi	HBO
2007 (60th)	Dexter	Scott Buck, Daniel Cerone, Drew Z. Greenberg, Lauren Gussis, Kevin Maynard, Clyde Phillips, Melissa Rosenberg, Tim Schlattmann	Showtime
2007 (60th)	Friday Night Lights	Bridget Carpenter, Kerry Ehrin, Carter Harris, Elizabeth Heldens, David Hudgins, Jason Katims, Patrick Massett, Andy Miller, Aaron Rahsaan Thomas, John Zinman	NBC
2007 (60th)	Mad Men	Lisa Albert, Bridget Bedard, Andre Jacquemetton, Maria Jacquemetton, Tom Palmer, Chris Provenzano, Robin Veith, Matthew Weiner	AMC
2007 (60th)	The Sopranos	David Chase, Diane Frolov, Andrew Schneider, Matthew Weiner, Terence Winter	HBO
2008 (61st)
2008 (61st)	Mad Men	Lisa Albert, Jane Anderson, Rick Cleveland, Kater Gordon, David Isaacs, Andre Jacquemetton, Maria Jacquemetton, Marti Noxon, Robin Veith, Matthew Weiner	AMC
2008 (61st)	Dexter	Scott Buck, Daniel Cerone, Charles H. Eglee, Adam E. Fierro, Lauren Gussis, Clyde Phillips, Scott Reynolds, Melissa Rosenberg, Tim Schlattmann	Showtime
2008 (61st)	Friday Night Lights	Bridget Carpenter, Kerry Ehrin, Brent Fletcher, Jason Gavin, Carter Harris, Elizabeth Heldens, David Hudgins, Jason Katims, Patrick Massett, Aaron Rahsaan Thomas, John Zinman	The 101 Network
2008 (61st)	Lost	Carlton Cuse, Drew Goddard, Adam Horowitz, Christina M. Kim, Edward Kitsis, Damon L. Lindelof, Greggory Nations, Kyle Pennington, Elizabeth Sarnoff, Brian K. Vaughan	ABC
2008 (61st)	The Wire	Ed Burns, Chris Collins, David Mills, David Simon, William F. Zorzi, Richard Price, Dennis Lehane, George Pelecanos	HBO
2009 (62nd)
2009 (62nd)	Mad Men	Lisa Albert, Andrew Colville, Kater Gordon, Cathryn Humphris, Andre Jacquemetton, Maria Jacquemetton, Brett Johnson, Erin Levy, Marti Noxon, Frank Pierson, Robin Veith, Dahvi Waller, Matthew Weiner	AMC
2009 (62nd)	Breaking Bad	Sam Catlin, Vince Gilligan, Peter Gould, George Mastras, J Roberts, John Shiban, Moira Walley-Beckett	AMC
2009 (62nd)	Dexter	Scott Buck, Charles H. Eglee, Lauren Gussis, Clyde Phillips, Scott Reynolds, Melissa Rosenberg, Tim Schlattmann, Wendy West	Showtime
2009 (62nd)	Friday Night Lights	Bridget Carpenter, Kerry Ehrin, Ron Fitzgerald, Brent Fletcher, Etan Frankel, Jason Gavin, Elizabeth Heldens, David Hudgins, Rolin Jones, Jason Katims, Patrick Massett, Derek Santos Olson, John Zinman	The 101 Network
2009 (62nd)	Lost	Carlton Cuse, Adam Horowitz, Edward Kitsis, Melinda Hsu Taylor, Damon Lindelof, Greggory Nations, Kyle Pennington, Elizabeth Sarnoff, Brian K. Vaughan, Paul Zbyszewski	ABC

=== 2010s ===
Year	Program	Writer(s)	Network
2010 (63rd)
2010 (63rd)	Mad Men	Jonathan Abrahams, Lisa Albert, Keith Huff, Jonathan Igla, Andre Jacquemetton, Maria Jacquemetton, Brett Johnson, Janet Leahy, Erin Levy, Tracy McMillan, Dahvi Waller, Matthew Weiner	AMC
2010 (63rd)	Boardwalk Empire	Meg Jackson, Lawrence Konner, Howard Korder, Steve Kornacki, Margaret Nagle, Tim Van Patten, Paul Simms, Terence Winter	HBO
2010 (63rd)	Breaking Bad	Sam Catlin, Vince Gilligan, Peter Gould, Gennifer Hutchison, George Mastras, Thomas Schnauz, John Shiban, Moira Walley-Beckett	AMC
2010 (63rd)	Dexter	Scott Buck, Manny Coto, Charles H. Eglee, Lauren Gussis, Chip Johannessen, Jim Leonard, Clyde Phillips, Scott Reynolds, Melissa Rosenberg, Tim Schlattmann, Wendy West	Showtime
2010 (63rd)	Friday Night Lights	Bridget Carpenter, Kerry Ehrin, Ron Fitzgerald, Etan Frankel, Monica Henderson, David Hudgins, Rolin Jones, Jason Katims, Patrick Massett, Derek Santos Olson, John Zinman	The 101 Network
2011 (64th)
2011 (64th)	Breaking Bad	Sam Catlin, Vince Gilligan, Peter Gould, Gennifer Hutchison, George Mastras, Thomas Schnauz, Moira Walley-Beckett	AMC
2011 (64th)	Boardwalk Empire	Bathsheba Doran, David Flebotte, Gina Gionfriddo, Howard Korder, Steve Kornacki, Itamar Moses, Margaret Nagle, Terence Winter	HBO
2011 (64th)	Game of Thrones	David Benioff, Bryan Cogman, Jane Espenson, George R. R. Martin, D. B. Weiss	HBO
2011 (64th)	The Good Wife	Courtney Kemp Agboh, Meredith Averill, Corinne Brinkerhoff, Leonard Dick, Keith Eisner, Karen Hall, Ted Humphrey, Michelle King, Robert King, Steve Lichtman, Matthew Montoya, Julia Wolfe	CBS
2011 (64th)	Homeland	Henry Bromell, Alexander Cary, Alex Gansa, Howard Gordon, Chip Johannessen, Gideon Raff, Meredith Stiehm	Showtime
2012 (65th)
2012 (65th)	Breaking Bad	Sam Catlin, Vince Gilligan, Peter Gould, Gennifer Hutchison, George Mastras, Thomas Schnauz, Moira Walley-Beckett	AMC
2012 (65th)	Boardwalk Empire	Dave Flebotte, Diane Frolov, Chris Haddock, Rolin Jones, Howard Korder, Steve Kornacki, Andrew Schneider, David Stenn, Terence Winter	HBO
2012 (65th)	Game of Thrones	David Benioff, Bryan Cogman, George R. R. Martin, Vanessa Taylor, D. B. Weiss	HBO
2012 (65th)	Homeland	Henry Bromell, Alexander Cary, Alex Gansa, Howard Gordon, Chip Johannessen, Meredith Stiehm	Showtime
2012 (65th)	Mad Men	Lisa Albert, Semi Chellas, Jonathan Igla, Andre Jacquemetton, Maria Jacquemetton, Brett Johnson, Janet Leahy, Victor Levin, Erin Levy, Frank Pierson, Michael Saltzman, Matthew Weiner	AMC
2013 (66th)
2013 (66th)	Breaking Bad	Sam Catlin, Vince Gilligan, Peter Gould, Gennifer Hutchison, George Mastras, Thomas Schnauz, Moira Walley-Beckett	AMC
2013 (66th)	The Good Wife	Meredith Averill, Leonard Dick, Keith Eisner, Jacqueline Hoyt, Ted Humphrey, Michelle King, Robert King, Erica Shelton Kodish, Matthew Montoya, J.C. Nolan, Luke Schelhaas, Nichelle Tramble Spellman, Craig Turk, Julie Wolfe	CBS
2013 (66th)	Homeland	Henry Bromell, William E. Bromell, Alexander Cary, Alex Gansa, Howard Gordon, Barbara Hall, Patrick Harbinson, Chip Johannessen, Meredith Stiehm, Charlotte Stoudt, James Yoshimura	Showtime
2013 (66th)	House of Cards	Kate Barnow, Rick Cleveland, Sam Forman, Gina Gionfriddo, Keith Huff, Sarah Treem, Beau Willimon	Netflix
2013 (66th)	Mad Men	Lisa Albert, Semi Chellas, Jason Grote, Jonathan Igla, Andre Jacquemetton, Maria Jacquemetton, Janet Leahy, Erin Levy, Michael Saltzman, Tom Smuts, Matthew Weiner, Carly Wray	AMC
2014 (67th)
2014 (67th)	True Detective	Nic Pizzolatto	HBO
2014 (67th)	Game of Thrones	David Benioff, Bryan Cogman, George R. R. Martin, D. B. Weiss	HBO
2014 (67th)	The Good Wife	Leonard Dick, Keith Eisner, Matthew Hodgson, Ted Humphrey, Michelle King, Robert King, Erica Shelton Kodish, Matthew Montoya, Luke Schelhaas, Nichelle Tramble Spellman, Craig Turk, Julia Wolfe	CBS
2014 (67th)	House of Cards	Bill Cain, Laura Eason, Sam R. Forman, William Kennedy, Kenneth Lin, John Mankiewicz, David Manson, Beau Willimon	Netflix
2014 (67th)	Mad Men	Heather Jeng Bladt, Semi Chellas, Jonathan Igla, David Iserson, Erin Levy, Matthew Weiner, Carly Wray	AMC
2015 (68th)
2015 (68th)	Mad Men	Lisa Albert, Semi Chellas, Jonathan Igla, Janet Leahy, Erin Levy, Tom Smuts, Robert Towne, Matthew Weiner, Carly Wray	AMC
2015 (68th)	The Americans	Peter Ackerman, Joshua Brand, Joel Fields, Stephen Schiff, Lara Shapiro, Joe Weisberg, Tracey Scott Wilson, Stuart Zicherman	FX
2015 (68th)	Better Call Saul	Vince Gilligan, Peter Gould, Gennifer Hutchison, Bradley Paul, Thomas Schnauz, Gordon Smith	AMC
2015 (68th)	Game of Thrones	David Benioff, Bryan Cogman, Dave Hill, D. B. Weiss	HBO
2015 (68th)	Mr. Robot	Kyle Bradstreet, Kate Erickson, Sam Esmail, David Iserson, Randolph Leon, Adam Penn, Matt Pyken	USA
2016 (69th)
2016 (69th)	The Americans	Peter Ackerman, Tanya Barfield, Joshua Brand, Joel Fields, Stephen Schiff, Joe Weisberg, Tracey Scott Wilson	FX
2016 (69th)	Better Call Saul	Ann Cherkis, Vince Gilligan, Jonathan Glatzer, Peter Gould, Gennifer Hutchison, Heather Marion, Thomas Schnauz, Gordon Smith	AMC
2016 (69th)	Game of Thrones	David Benioff, Bryan Cogman, Dave Hill, D. B. Weiss	HBO
2016 (69th)	Stranger Things	Paul Dichter, Justin Doble, The Duffer Brothers, Jessica Mecklenburg, Jessie Nickson-Lopez, Alison Tatlock	Netflix
2016 (69th)	Westworld	Ed Brubaker, Bridget Carpenter; Dan Dietz, Halley Gross; Lisa Joy; Katherine Lingenfelter, Dominic Mitchell, Jonathan Nolan, Roberto Patino, Daniel T. Thomsen, Charles Yu	HBO
2017 (70th)
2017 (70th)	The Handmaid's Tale	Ilene Chaiken, Nina Fiore, Dorothy Fortenberry, Leila Gerstein, John Herrera, Lynn Maxcy, Bruce Miller, Kira Snyder, Wendy Straker Hauser, Eric Tuchman	Hulu
2017 (70th)	The Americans	Peter Ackerman, Hilary Bettis, Joshua Brand, Joel Fields, Stephen Schiff, Joe Weisberg, Tracey Scott Wilson	FX
2017 (70th)	Better Call Saul	Ann Cherkis, Vince Gilligan, Jonathan Glatzer, Peter Gould, Gennifer Hutchison, Heather Marion, Thomas Schnauz, Gordon Smith	AMC
2017 (70th)	Game of Thrones	David Benioff, Bryan Cogman, Dave Hill, D. B. Weiss	HBO
2017 (70th)	Stranger Things	Paul Dichter, Justin Doble, The Duffer Brothers, Jessica Mecklenburg, Jessie Nickson-Lopez, Alison Tatlock	Netflix
2018 (71st)
2018 (71st)	The Americans	Peter Ackerman, Hilary Bettis, Joshua Brand, Joel Fields, Sarah Nolen, Stephen Schiff, Justin Weinberger, Joe Weisberg, Tracey Scott Wilson	FX
2018 (71st)	Better Call Saul	Ann Cherkis, Vince Gilligan, Peter Gould, Gennifer Hutchison, Heather Marion, Bob Odenkirk, Thomas Schnauz, Gordon Smith, Alison Tatlock	AMC
2018 (71st)	The Crown	Tom Edge, Amy Jenkins, Peter Morgan	Netflix
2018 (71st)	The Handmaid's Tale	Yahlin Chang, Nina Fiore, Dorothy Fortenberry, John Herrera, Lynn Maxcy, Bruce Miller, Kira Snyder, Eric Tuchman	Hulu
2018 (71st)	Succession	Jesse Armstrong, Simon Blackwell, Jon Brown, Jonathan Glatzer, Anna Jordan, Lucy Prebble, Georgia Pritchett, Tony Roche, Susan Soon He Stanton, Daniel Zelman	HBO
2019 (72nd)
2019 (72nd)	Succession	Jesse Armstrong, Alice Birch, Jon Brown, Jonathan Glatzer, Cord Jefferson, Mary Laws, Lucy Prebble, Georgia Pritchett, Tony Roche, Gary Shteyngart, Susan Soon He Stanton, Will Tracy	HBO
2019 (72nd)	The Crown	James Graham, David Hancock, Peter Morgan	Netflix
2019 (72nd)	The Handmaid's Tale	Marissa Jo Cerar, Yahlin Chang, Nina Fiore, Dorothy Fortenberry, Jacy Heldrich, John Herrera, Lynn Renee Maxcy, Bruce Miller, Kira Snyder, Eric Tuchman	Hulu
2019 (72nd)	Mindhunter	Pamela Cederquist, Joshua Donen, Marcus Gardley, Shaun Grant, Liz Hannah, Phillip Howze, Jason Johnson, Doug Jung, Colin Louro, Alex Metcalf, Courtenay Miles, Dominic Orlando, Joe Penhall, Ruby Rae Spiegel	Netflix
2019 (72nd)	Watchmen	Lila Byock, Nick Cuse, Christal Henry, Branden Jacobs-Jenkins, Cord Jefferson, Jeff Jensen, Claire Kiechel, Damon Lindelof, Stacy Osei-Kuffour, Tom Spezialy, Carly Wray	HBO

=== 2020s ===
Year	Program	Writer(s)	Network
2020 (73rd)
2020 (73rd)	The Crown	Peter Morgan, Jonathan Wilson	Netflix
2020 (73rd)	Better Call Saul	Ann Cherkis, Vince Gilligan, Peter Gould, Ariel Levine, Heather Marion, Thomas Schnauz, Gordon Smith, Alison Tatlock	AMC
2020 (73rd)	The Boys	Eric Kripke, Ellie Monahan, Anslem Richardson, Craig Rosenberg, Michael Saltzman, Rebecca Sonnenshine	Prime Video
2020 (73rd)	The Mandalorian	Rick Famuyiwa, Jon Favreau, Dave Filoni	Disney+
2020 (73rd)	Ozark	Laura Deeley, Bill Dubuque, Paul Kolsby, Miki Johnson, Chris Mundy, John Shiban, Ning Zhou, Martin Zimmerman	Netflix
2021 (74th)
2021 (74th)	Succession	Jesse Armstrong, Jon Brown, Jamie Carragher, Ted Cohen, Francesca Gardiner, Lucy Prebble, Georgia Pritchett, Tony Roche, Gary Shteyngart, Susan Soon He Stanton, Will Tracy	HBO
2021 (74th)	The Handmaid's Tale	Yahlin Chang, Nina Fiore, Dorothy Fortenberry, Jacy Heldrich, John Herrera, Bruce Miller, Aly Monroe, Kira Snyder, Eric Tuchman	Hulu
2021 (74th)	Loki	Bisha K. Ali, Jess Dweck, Elissa Karasik, Tom Kauffman, Eric Martin, Michael Waldron	Disney+
2021 (74th)	The Morning Show	Jeff Augustin, Brian Chamberlayne, Kerry Ehrin, Kristen Layden, Erica Lipez, Justin Matthews, Adam Milch, Stacy Osei-Kuffour, Torrey Speer, Scott Troy, Ali Vingiano	Apple TV+
2021 (74th)	Yellowjackets	Cameron Brent Johnson, Katherine Kearns, Jonathan Lisco, Ashley Lyle, Bart Nickerson, Liz Phang, Ameni Rozsa, Sarah L. Thompson, Chantelle M. Wells	Showtime
2022 (75th)
2022 (75th)	Severance	Chris Black, Andrew Colville, Kari Drake, Dan Erickson, Mark Friedman, Helen Leigh, Anna Moench, Amanda Overton	Apple TV+
2022 (75th)	Andor	Dan Gilroy, Tony Gilroy, Stephen Schiff, Beau Willimon	Disney+
2022 (75th)	Better Call Saul	Ann Cherkis, Vince Gilligan, Peter Gould, Ariel Levine, Thomas Schnauz, Gordon Smith, Alison Tatlock	AMC
2022 (75th)	The Crown	Peter Morgan	Netflix
2022 (75th)	Yellowjackets	Cameron Brent Johnson, Katherine Kearns, Jonathan Lisco, Ashley Lyle, Bart Nickerson, Liz Phang, Ameni Rozsa, Sarah L. Thompson, Chantelle M. Wells	Showtime
2023 (76th)
2023 (76th)	Succession	Will Arbery, Jesse Armstrong, Miriam Battye, Jon Brown, Jamie Carragher, Ted Cohen, Nate Elston, Francesca Gardiner, Callie Hersheway, Lucy Prebble, Georgia Pritchett, Tony Roche, Susan Soon He Stanton, Will Tracy	HBO/Max
2023 (76th)	The Crown	Peter Morgan	Netflix
2023 (76th)	The Curse	Carmen Christopher, Nathan Fielder, Alex Huggins, Carrie Kemper, Benny Safdie	Showtime
2023 (76th)	The Diplomat	Eli Attie, Debora Cahn, Mia Chung, Anna Hagen, Amanda Johnson-Zetterstrom, Peter Noah	Netflix
2023 (76th)	The Last of Us	Neil Druckmann, Halley Gross, Craig Mazin, Bo Shim	HBO/Max
2024 (77th)
2024 (77th)	Shōgun	Shannon Goss, Maegan Houang, Rachel Kondo, Matt Lambert, Justin Marks, Caillin Puente, Nigel Williams, Emily Yoshida	FX on Hulu
2024 (77th)	The Boys	Geoff Aull, Jessica Chou, Paul Grellong, Eric Kripke, Ellie Monahan, Ellie Monahan, Judalina Neira, David Reed, Anslem Richardson	Prime Video
2024 (77th)	The Diplomat	Peter Ackerman, Eli Attie, Debora Cahn, Anna Hagen, Amanda Johnson-Zetterstrom, Peter Noah	Netflix
2024 (77th)	Fallout	Jake Bender, Karey Dornetto, Zach Dunn, Kieran Fitzgerald, Chaz Hawkins, Lisa Joy, Carson Mell, Jonathan Nolan, Geneva Robertson-Dworet, Gursimran Sandhu, Graham Wagner	Prime Video
2024 (77th)	Mr. & Mrs. Smith	Carla Ching, Adamma Ebo, Adanne Ebo, Donald Glover, Stephen Glover, Schuyler Pappas, Francesca Sloane, Yvonne Hana Yi	Prime Video
2025 (78th)
2025 (78th)	The Pitt	Cynthia Adarkwa, Simran Baidwan, Valerie Chu, R. Scott Gemmill, Elyssa Gershman, Joe Sachs, Noah Wyle	Max
2025 (78th)	Andor	Tom Bissell, Dan Gilroy, Tony Gilroy, Beau Willimon	Disney+
2025 (78th)	Pluribus	Vera Blasi, Jenn Carroll, Vince Gilligan, Jonny Gomez, Peter Gould, Ariel Levine, Gordon Smith, Alison Tatlock	Apple TV
2025 (78th)	Severance	Adam Countee, Mohamad El Masri, Dan Erickson, Mark Friedman, Anna Ouyang Moench, K.C. Perry, Megan Ritchie, Erin Wagoner, Beau Willimon, Wei-Ning Yu	Apple TV
2025 (78th)	The White Lotus	Mike White	HBO

== Total awards by network ==
- AMC – 7
- HBO – 6
- FX – 3
- Hulu – 2
- ABC – 1
- HBO Max - 1
- Netflix - 1

== Total nominations by network ==
- HBO – 26
- AMC – 19
- Netflix - 13
- Showtime - 10
- ABC – 6
- FX – 5
- Disney+ - 4
- Hulu – 4
- Apple TV+ - 4
- Prime Video - 4
- The 101 Network - 3
- CBS - 3
- NBC - 2
- Fox - 1
- HBO Max - 1
- USA - 1

== Programs with multiple awards ==
4 awards

- Mad Men (AMC)

3 awards

- Breaking Bad (AMC)
- Succession (HBO)

2 awards

- The Americans (FX)

== Programs with multiple nominations ==
8 nominations

- Mad Men (AMC)

6 nominations

- Better Call Saul (AMC)
- Game of Thrones (HBO)

5 nominations

- Breaking Bad (AMC)
- The Crown (Netflix)

4 nominations

- The Americans (FX)
- Dexter (Showtime)
- Friday Night Lights (NBC), (The 101 Network)
- The Handmaid's Tale (Hulu)
- Lost (ABC)
- Succession (HBO)

3 nominations

- Boardwalk Empire (HBO)
- The Good Wife (CBS)
- Homeland (Showtime)

2 nominations

- Andor (Disney+
- The Boys (Prime Video)
- Deadwood (HBO)
- The Diplomat (Netflix)
- Grey's Anatomy (ABC)
- House of Cards (Netflix)
- Severance (Apple TV)
- The Sopranos (HBO)
- Stranger Things (Netflix)
- The Wire (HBO)
- Yellowjackets (Showtime)
