= Anna Ouyang Moench =

American playwright and screenwriter

- Education: University of California, San Diego (MFA)
- Occupations: Playwright, screenwriter

Anna Ouyang Moench is an American playwright and screenwriter. She has written plays like Birds of North America and Man of God, and her plays have been directed in numerous venues across the United States such as the Odyssey Theatre, the Geffen Playhouse, and Theater Mu.

In television, Moench has written for the award-winning Apple TV+ sci-fi series Severance and is an executive producer on the second season of A24's Beef. She also serves as showrunner for Mr. & Mrs. Smith starting with its second season.

== Education ==
Moench is a class of 2018 graduate of the University of California, San Diego MFA program.

== Works ==
=== Plays ===
Title	Productions
Birds of North America	Thrown Stone Theatre Company; Boulder Ensemble Theater Company; Mosaic Theater Company of DC; Theater with a View; Odyssey Theatre
In Quietness	Walkerspace
Man of God	Geffen Playhouse; Shotgun Players; Theater Mu; Williamstown Theatre Festival; InterAct Theatre Company; East West Players
Mothers	Duke on 42nd Street
Sin Eaters	Theater Exile
Your Local Theater Presents: A Christmas Carol, by Charles Dickens, Again	La Jolla Playhouse

=== Television ===
- Beef (executive producer credit on season 2)
- Severance (writing credits on season 1, episode 5 and season 2, episode 4)
- Mr. & Mrs. Smith (showrunner for season 2)

=== Other ===
In 2022, Moench wrote one of five monologues for the National Asian American Theatre Company's Out of Time production directed by Les Waters. The monologues were performed by Glenn Kubota.

== Awards ==
- 2014 Kilroys' List—Hunger, nomination
- 2017 Kilroys' List—Birds of North America, honorable mention
- 2020 Kilroys' List—Sin Eaters
- 2020 Steinberg Playwright Award
- 2023 Writers Guild of America Award for Television: Dramatic Series—Severance
- 2023 Writers Guild of America Award for Television: New Series—Severance
