= Beef (TV series) =

American comedy-drama anthology television series (2023–present)

- Season 2 logo
- Genre: Anthology; Dark humor; Comedy drama; Psychological thriller; Tragicomedy
- Created by: Lee Sung Jin
- Showrunner: Lee Sung Jin
- Starring: Steven Yeun; Ali Wong; Joseph Lee; Young Mazino; David Choe; Patti Yasutake; Oscar Isaac; Carey Mulligan; Cailee Spaeny; Charles Melton; Youn Yuh-jung; Seoyeon Jang; William Fichtner; Matthew Kim (BM); Mikaela Hoover; Song Kang-ho
- Music by: Bobby Krlic; Finneas O'Connell
- Country of origin: United States
- Original languages: English; Korean
- No. of seasons: 2
- No. of episodes: 18

Production
- Executive producers: Lee Sung Jin; Steven Yeun; Ali Wong; Jake Schreier; Ravi Nandan; Alli Reich; Oscar Isaac; Carey Mulligan; Cailee Spaeny; Charles Melton; Anna Ouyang Moench; Kitao Sakurai; Sam French; Ethan Kuperberg
- Producer: Matthew Medlin
- Cinematography: Larkin Seiple; James Laxton
- Editors: Harry Yoon; Nat Fuller; Laura Zempel; Jordan Kim; Lauren Connelly; Lilly Wild
- Running time: 30–54 minutes
- Production companies: A24; Bugsy Bell Productions; Universal Remote (season 1); Buji Productions; Domo Arigato Productions (season 1); Celadon Pictures (season 2)

Original release
- Network: Netflix
- Release: April 6, 2023 – present

Beef is an American comedy drama anthology television series created by Lee Sung Jin for Netflix. Season 1 stars Steven Yeun and Ali Wong as Danny Cho and Amy Lau, two strangers whose involvement in a road rage incident escalates into a prolonged feud. Appearing in supporting roles are Joseph Lee, Young Mazino, David Choe, and Patti Yasutake. Season 2 stars Oscar Isaac and Carey Mulligan as Joshua Martín and Lindsay Crane-Martín, and Cailee Spaeny and Charles Melton as Ashley and Austin, two couples; after the poor latter two blackmail the rich former two with footage of a heated argument that would threaten their image, a similarly prolonged feud ensues.

The ten-episode first season was released on Netflix on April 6, 2023, to critical acclaim for Yeun's and Wong's performances as well as the writing and directing. At the 75th Primetime Emmy Awards, it won eight awards, including Outstanding Limited or Anthology Series and acting wins for Yeun and Wong. At the 81st Golden Globe Awards, it won in all three of its nominated categories, including Best Television Limited Series, Anthology Series, or Motion Picture Made for Television.

The second season premiered on April 16, 2026. It received positive reviews and 16 nominations at the 78th Primetime Emmy Awards, including Outstanding Limited or Anthology Series and acting nominations for Isaac, Mulligan, Melton, and Youn Yuh-jung.

== Cast and characters ==
=== Season 1 ===
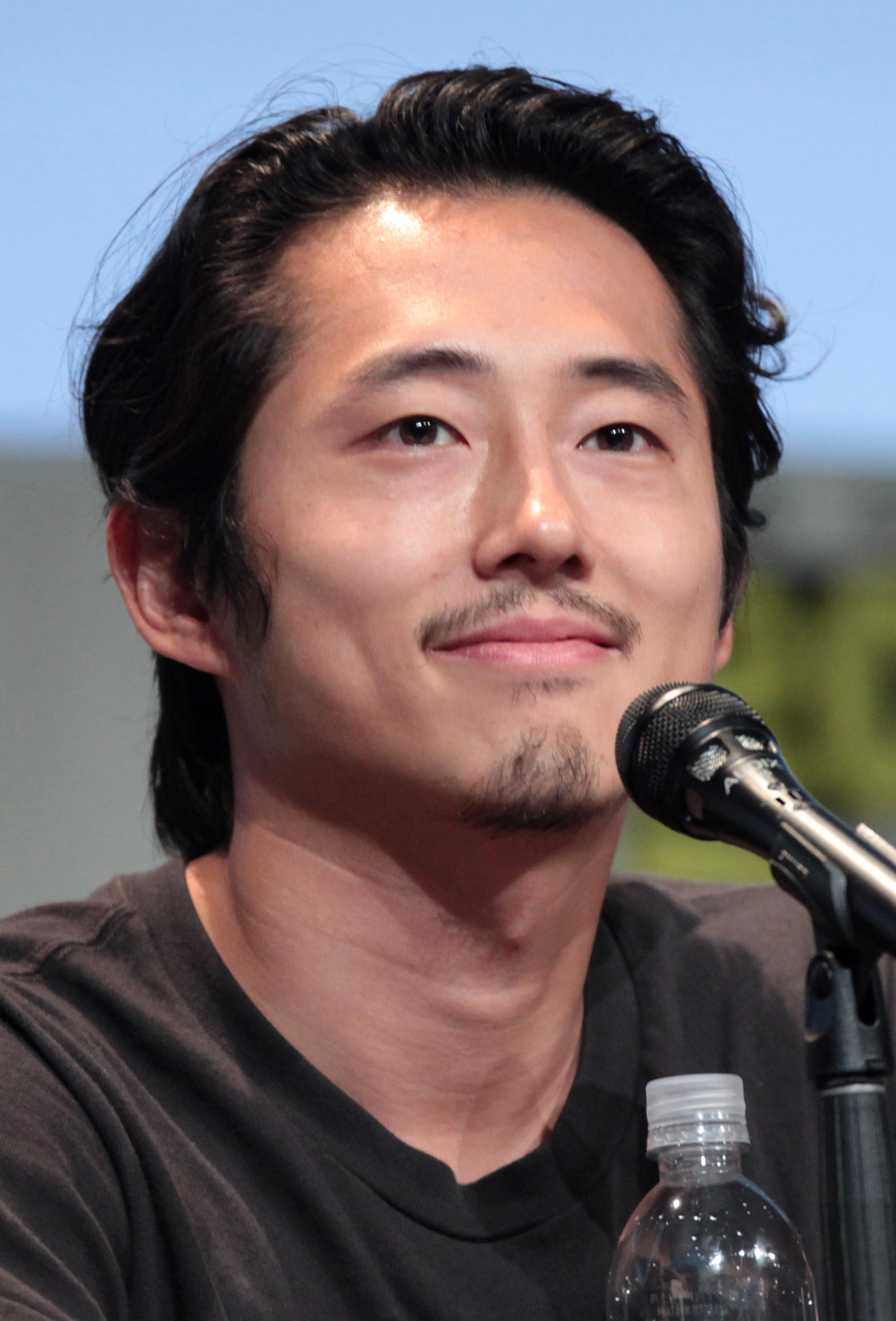
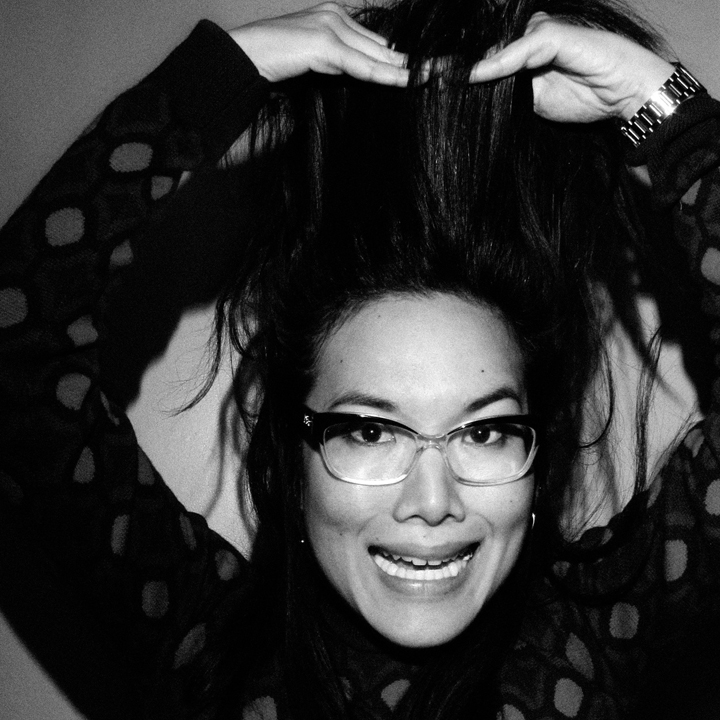
The first season stars Steven Yeun and Ali Wong

==== Main ====
- Steven Yeun as Danny Cho, a struggling contractor of Korean heritage who is involved in a road rage incident
- Ali Wong as Amy Lau, a small business owner of Chinese and Vietnamese heritage and the other party in the road rage incident
  - Miya Cech portrays a young Amy
- Joseph Lee as George Nakai, a sculptor of Japanese heritage and Amy's stay-at-home husband
- Young Mazino as Paul Cho, Danny's languishing younger brother
- David Choe as Isaac Cho, Danny and Paul's criminal cousin, recently released from prison
- Patti Yasutake as Fumi Nakai, George's mother

==== Recurring ====
- Maria Bello as Jordan, the wealthy owner of a home improvement chain store
- Ashley Park as Naomi, Jordan's sister-in-law and Amy's neighbor
- Mia Serafino as Mia, Amy's assistant
- Remy Holt as June, Amy and George's young daughter
- Justin H. Min as Edwin, a praise leader in a Korean church and husband of Danny's ex-girlfriend
- Alyssa Gihee Kim as Veronica, Danny's ex-girlfriend and Edwin's wife
- Andie Ju as Esther, a friend of Edwin and Veronica
- Andrew Santino as Michael, an associate of Isaac
- Rek Lee as Bobby, another associate of Isaac

==== Guest ====
- Kelvin Han Yee as Bruce Lau, Amy's father, a Chinese American man raised in the Midwest
- Hong Dao as Hanh Trinh Lau, Amy's mother, a Vietnamese immigrant
- Ione Skye as Mysterious Woman

=== Season 2 ===
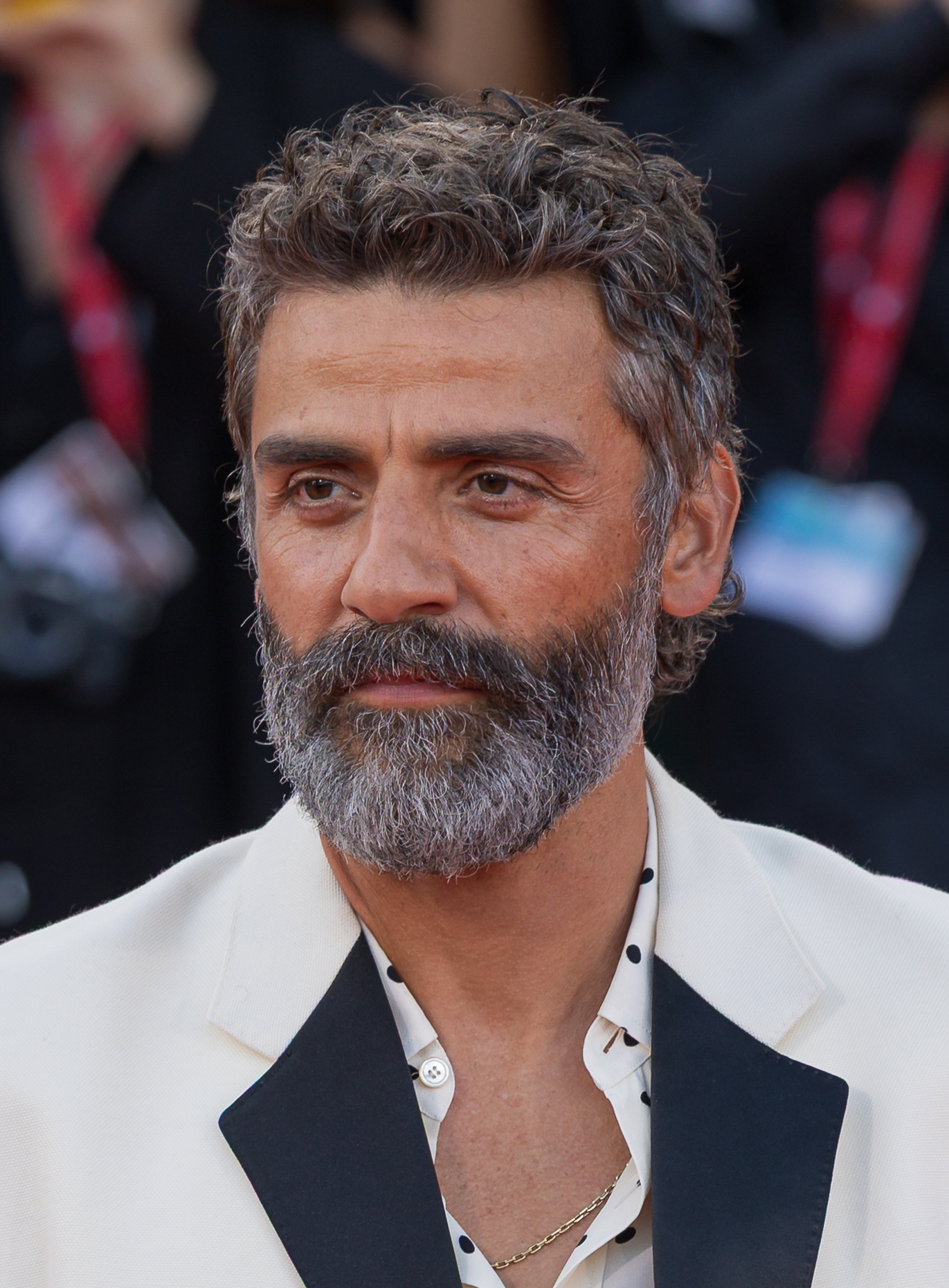
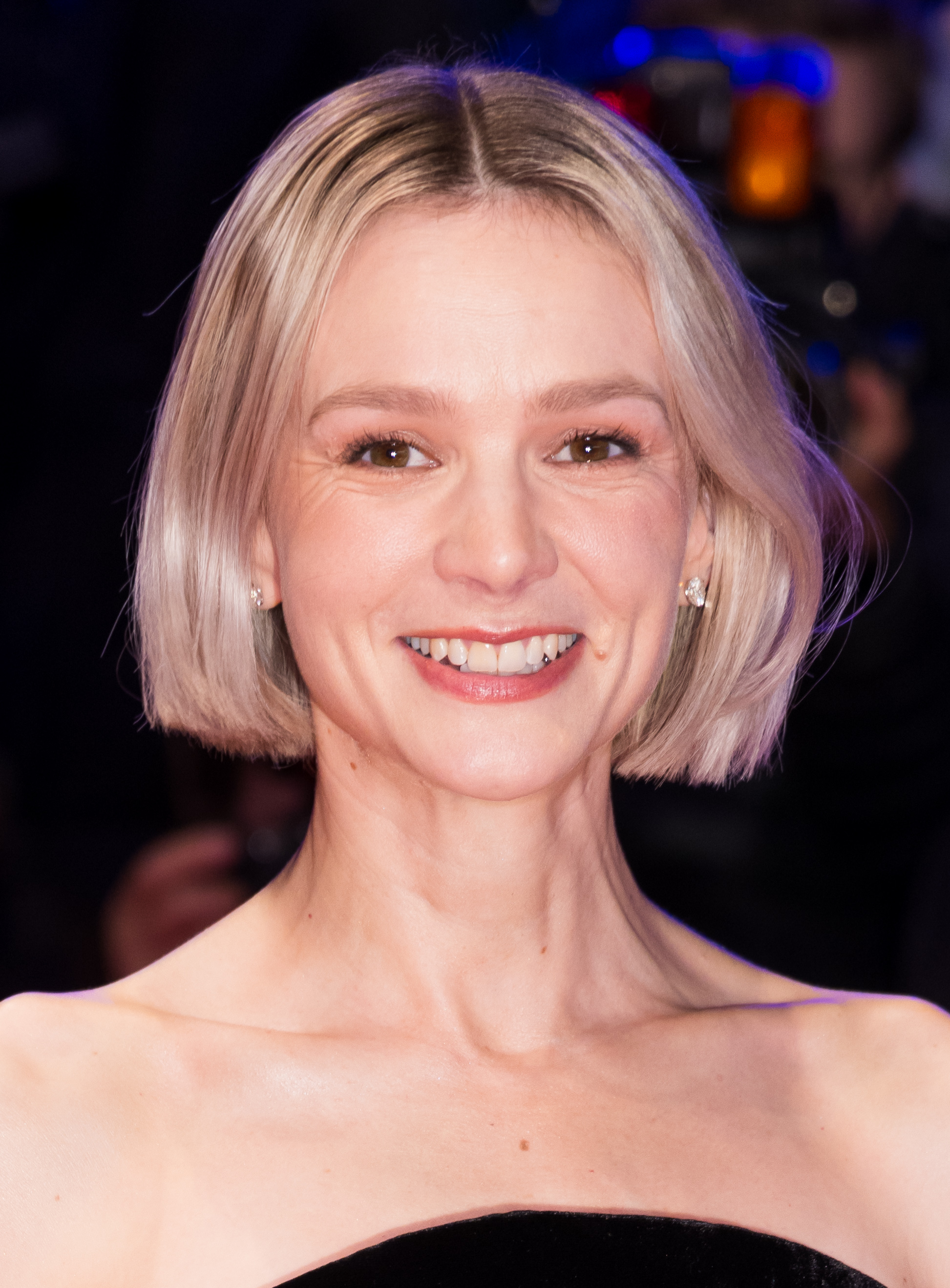
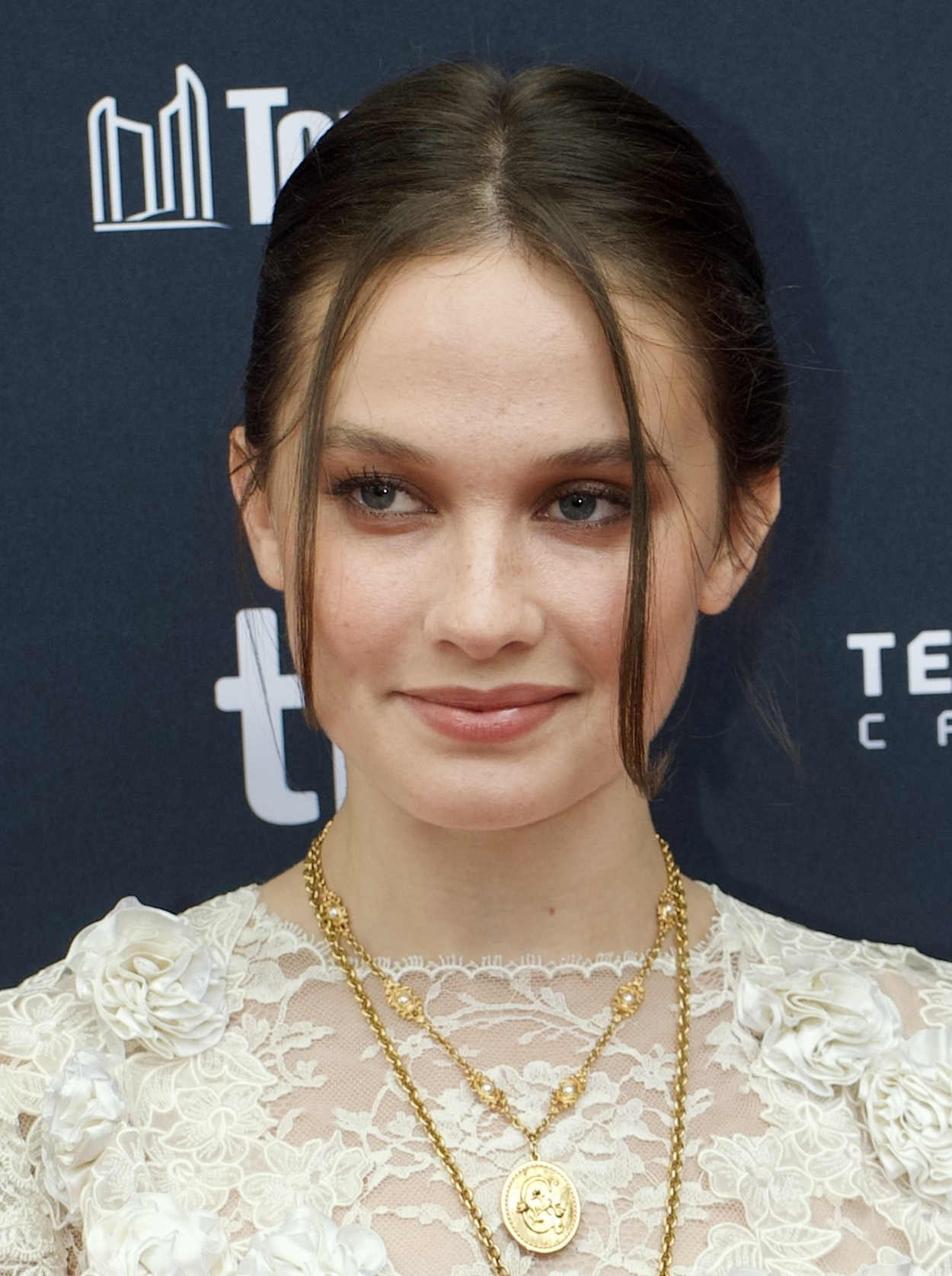
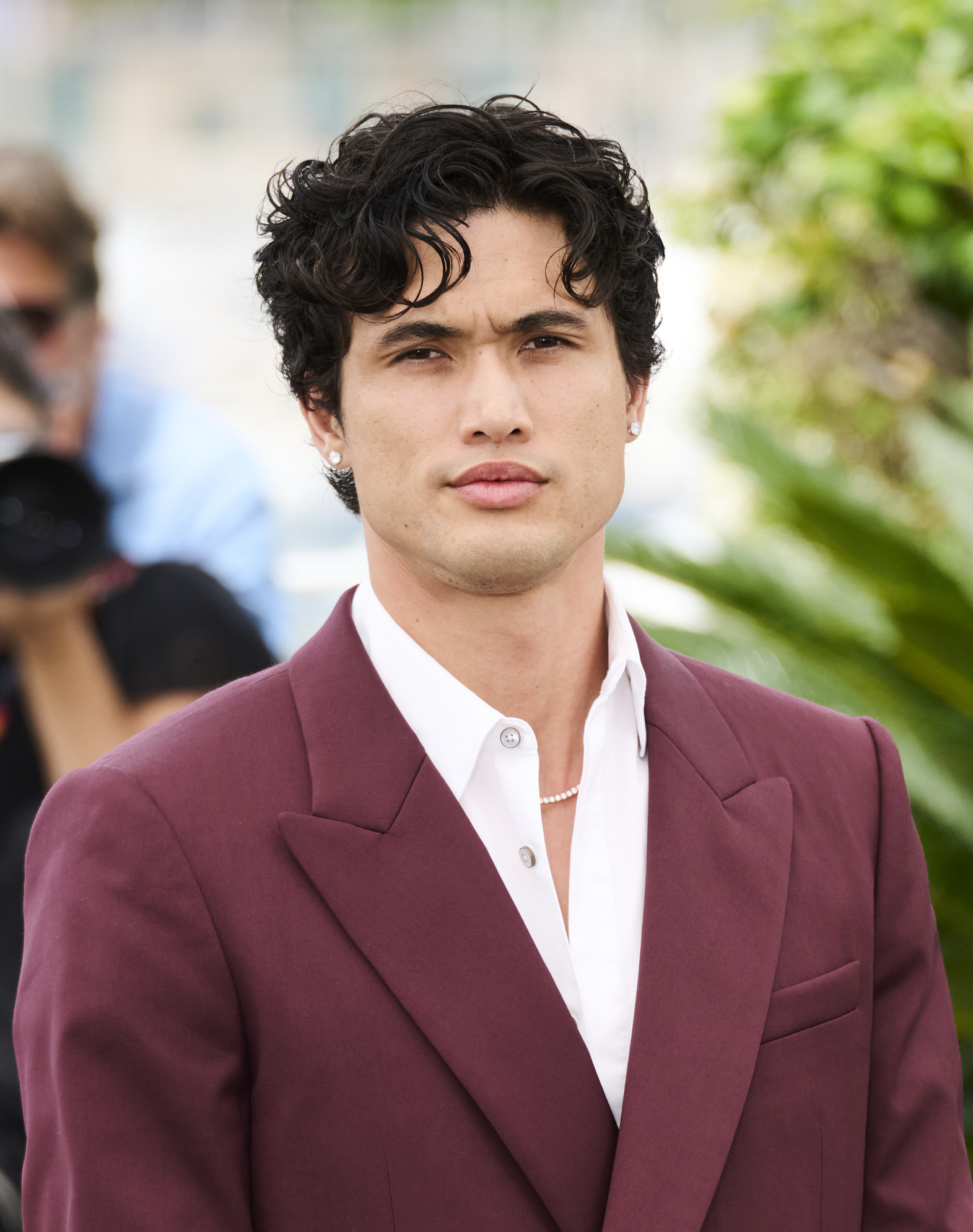
The second season stars Oscar Isaac, Carey Mulligan, Cailee Spaeny, and Charles Melton

==== Main ====
- Oscar Isaac as Joshua Martín, the general manager of the Monte Vista Point Country Club in California, Lindsay's husband, and Ashley's boss
- Carey Mulligan as Lindsay Crane-Martín, Josh's interior designer wife
- Cailee Spaeny as Ashley Miller, an employee at the Monte Vista Point Country Club and Austin's fiancée
- Charles Melton as Austin Davis, an aspiring personal trainer and Ashley's fiancé
- Youn Yuh-jung as Chairwoman Park, the billionaire new owner of the Monte Vista Point Country Club
- Seoyeon Jang as Eunice, Chairwoman Park's personal assistant and interpreter
- William Fichtner as Troy, a Baby boomer and an affluent member of the Monte Vista Point Country Club who gets VIP services from Josh
- Matthew Kim (BM) as Woosh, a Gen Z professional tennis player and coach at the Monte Vista Point Country Club, the son of Chairwoman Park's first husband
- Mikaela Hoover as Ava, Troy's much younger wife
- Song Kang-ho as Dr. Kim, Chairwoman Park's second husband and a prominent plastic surgeon in Seoul

==== Recurring ====
- Michole Briana White as Janet
- Greg Benson as Steve
- Jason Her as Chief Counsel to Chairwoman Park, who devises strategies to cover up the death at Trochos as a "fixer"
- Fernanda Andrade as Sara

==== Guest ====
- Benny Blanco as himself
- Baron Davis as himself
- Michael Phelps as himself
- Eduardo Franco as Eduardo
- Sunisa Lee as herself
- Finneas O'Connell as himself

The band Hot Chip also appears as itself.

== Episodes ==
| Season | Episodes | Originally released |
|---|---|---|
| 1 | 10 | April 6, 2023 |
| 2 | 8 | April 16, 2026 |

=== Season 1 (2023) ===
| No. overall | No. in season | Title | Directed by | Written by | Original release date |
|---|---|---|---|---|---|
| 1 | 1 | "The Birds Don't Sing, They Screech in Pain" | Hikari | Lee Sung Jin | April 6, 2023 |
Danny Cho, a contractor struggling to maintain clients, nearly drives his truck into Amy Lau's SUV in the parking lot of home improvement store Forsters, where Amy is organizing the sale of her business to the chain's owner, Jordan. The incident between Amy and Danny escalates to road rage and a destructive car chase. Amy drives away, and Danny notes her license plate number. Both are struggling with tensions in their personal and professional lives. Danny believes his brother Paul is irresponsible and feels burdened to help his elderly parents, who moved back to Korea after being forced to sell their motel business. Amy, the breadwinner, is stressed by trying to close the sale and struggles to convey its importance to her well-intentioned stay-at-home husband, George. Later, Danny borrows money from his recently paroled cousin Isaac, whose illicit activities resulted in the loss of the Chos' motel business. He is also fired by one of his clients after offering to trim the trees. Danny tracks Amy down via her license plate number and uses his role as a contractor to enter her Calabasas home and take revenge by urinating all over her bathroom. Furious, Amy chases him and notes his license plate number as he drives away laughing.
| 2 | 2 | "The Rapture of Being Alive" | Jake Schreier | Alice Ju | April 6, 2023 |
Amy and George agree to find Danny and use his license plate number to track him down to his family's old motel business. She also begins to flood his business with bad reviews. Affected by the reviews, Danny gets the idea from Isaac to start a new business under Paul's name. Paul suggests they try to acquire new clients in Orange County and proposes they approach Danny's ex-girlfriend, Veronica, and her husband, Edwin. The couple invites the Cho brothers to their church, Living Glory. Amy catfishes Paul on Instagram, impersonating her assistant Mia (who is having an emotional affair with George), and has an argument with George at a gallery opening because she feels unsupported when he refuses to sell a beloved art piece made by his deceased father, a famous sculptor, to Jordan. Upset that the deal might be jeopardized, Amy funnels her anger into vandalizing Danny's truck. After seeing the truck, Danny argues with Paul, resulting in both of them canceling their planned joint business venture. Amy agrees to couples therapy with George. Later that night, Danny drives to Amy's home, wielding a hammer, but is deterred when motion-sensor lights turn on.
| 3 | 3 | "I Am Inhabited by a Cry" | Jake Schreier | Carrie Kemper | April 6, 2023 |
Amy and George attend couples therapy. Danny experiences a strong emotional release while attending worship at Veronica and Edwin's church and is invited to do repairs on the building. After a stressful meeting with Jordan, Amy opens up to Paul over the phone. Amy tells George she feels blocked, but he does not seem to understand, leaving her feeling more disconnected. Hoping to secure a loan to buy a piece of property for his parents, Danny is rejected by every bank because he lacks a substantial down payment. He and Isaac approach Living Glory Church to secure the money and offer their contracting services free of charge for renovations. With their plan in motion, the cousins steal materials for the renovations at another construction site. Jordan brings Amy the term sheet for their deal, which involves Amy staying on for five more years, to Amy's dismay. Understanding her disappointment, Jordan convinces her to come to her corporate retreat in Las Vegas to discuss the terms with her board. Paul visits Amy's store looking for "Kayla." When she admits to catfishing him, Paul kisses her.
| 4 | 4 | "Just Not All at the Same Time" | Hikari | Alex Russell | April 6, 2023 |
Amy tells Paul she is married and is leaving for Las Vegas to speak at a conference. Amy and George prepare to leave, but their daughter, June, vehemently refuses to go, so George remains home to look after her. After getting Danny and Isaac drunk, Paul steals Danny's truck and drives to Las Vegas. When they recover, Danny and Isaac follow Paul. Paul meets Amy at her hotel room, and they spend the night together, although Amy forbids sexual activity. As Amy talks at the conference, Isaac spots Paul in the hotel restaurant and chases him to Amy's room, where Danny and Isaac confront him. Danny and Isaac spot Amy at the conference as they leave the hotel, where Danny heckles her about the road rage incident before he and Isaac are escorted out by security. After the talk, Amy tells Jordan she intends to sign on, as she feels this is what she has been missing in her life. Amy's neighbor, Naomi, overhearing the heckling, looks at the online post about the road rage incident again. After another chase, Danny and Isaac are apprehended by police as Amy watches, gloating.
| 5 | 5 | "Such Inward Secret Creatures" | Hikari | Marie Hanhnhon Nguyen & Niko Gutierrez-Kovner | April 6, 2023 |
After crossing state lines to find Paul in Las Vegas, Isaac is placed under house arrest. Danny befriends George using a false name and visits Isaac to try to convince him to steal valuable artworks from George and Amy's home. Isaac lashes out over his arrest and the money Danny owes him, and does not agree to the plan. Danny convinces Isaac's associates, Michael and Bobby, to rob the house, but when George confides in him about his loneliness, he feels guilty and tries to call off the robbery. Danny convinces George to leave home temporarily. Amy returns home and invites Paul over. They have sex but argue after Paul asks her for money. Amy orders Paul to leave. Naomi becomes suspicious about Amy's involvement in the road rage incident, which Amy has been covering up, and starts investigating. George's mother, Fumi, sneaks into the home to look at the artworks, intending to sell them. Michael and Bobby break in and are confronted by Fumi. After shooting at them with Amy's gun, she trips and falls down the stairs.
| 6 | 6 | "We Draw a Magic Circle" | Jake Schreier | Joanna Calo | April 6, 2023 |
Isaac takes over running the renovation operations at the church. Danny tries to get Paul to open up about his breakup with Amy, but Paul remains closed off. George and Mia decide to end their affair. Amy and George bond after June is perturbed by Fumi's comment that they may be separating. Naomi visits Fumi, trying to investigate the connection between Amy's road rage incident and the robbery. Amy administers Fumi extra painkillers, leaving her unconscious and unable to talk to Naomi. Amy meets with Danny, and agrees to pay him enough to clear his debt with Isaac to implicate someone else in the incident. But Fumi tells Naomi there is no connection, which leads Amy to cancel the deal with Danny. Isaac is arrested because the road-rage episode becomes public and the police believe he was the one driving his truck. Danny and Paul's basketball team routs Edwin's in the church tournament.
| 7 | 7 | "I Am a Cage" | Jake Schreier | Lee Sung Jin & Kevin Rosen | April 6, 2023 |
Eight months later, Amy has finalized the sale of her business. She and George have bought a vacation home and hired a nanny to help care for June. Danny has become a praise leader and built his parents a house using the cash Isaac hid in the church. Edwin asks to get involved in Danny's business, but Danny denies any illegal activity and rejects him. After George admits to his affair with Mia, Amy expresses her doubts about her marriage to their couples counselor. George invites Danny to a party celebrating his art, where Danny realizes Amy was the woman Paul had been seeing. After arguing with Danny, Amy asks George about moving out of the city. Paul goes through the business accounts and becomes suspicious, but Danny diverts him by revealing Amy used Paul to further their feud. The next day, Paul finds George at his home and reveals the affair between him and Amy. Amy later returns home and finds George and June gone. Danny picks his parents up from the airport and drives them to the house he built for them. When they arrive, they find that the house has burned down.
| 8 | 8 | "The Drama of Original Choice" | Jake Schreier | Lee Sung Jin & Jean Kyoung Frazier | April 6, 2023 |
Amy visits her parents to confront them about her troubled past and reveals her feud with Danny, along with a physical relationship with Paul. Her father advises a divorce. Danny suspects arson after a fire investigator suggests it, spots Edwin watching the scene, and later attacks him. Edwin denies starting the fire, confessing to minor pranks out of jealousy over Veronica. Danny learns the faulty wiring he installed caused the fire, but lies to Paul, claiming Amy set it with gasoline. Danny, using a false name, tries to plant evidence against Amy at George's house. George discovers Danny's true identity, confronts him with a gun, and they fight. Danny knocks George unconscious and escapes, only to find June in the backseat of his truck.
| 9 | 9 | "The Great Fabricator" | Jake Schreier | Lee Sung Jin | April 6, 2023 |
Isaac's name is cleared, and he is released from prison. George calls Amy, telling her Danny has kidnapped June. Danny brings June back to the motel, where Isaac assaults him and demands his money. An Amber alert is issued, prompting Isaac to kidnap June. He demands a $500,000 ransom from Amy, who encourages him to rob valuable artifacts from Jordan's home instead. Amy calls George and tells him to collect June, but not to call the police. Bobby holds Danny, Paul, and June hostage in the car while Isaac and Michael break into Jordan's home, holding Jordan, Naomi, and Amy at gunpoint. The police arrive. Danny and Paul manage to subdue Bobby, escape their restraints, and leave June in the car, but are brought into the house at gunpoint by Michael. Isaac locks them outside. Jordan and Naomi attempt to escape to a panic room, but Naomi activates the door control too early, fatally crushing Jordan. A smokescreen is released into the house as a firefight ensues between the police, Michael, and Isaac. Danny helps Paul escape. He admits he secretly threw away Paul's college applications because he did not want to be alone. Distraught, Paul leaves but Danny soon hears gunshots and gets no response when he calls to Paul. Michael is killed; Isaac and Bobby are arrested. Amy learns George has taken June home without her, and she will be denied custody. Danny escapes Jordan's house in a stolen truck. He encounters Amy on the road, who chases him before they lose control of their vehicles and drive off a cliff.
| 10 | 10 | "Figures of Light" | Lee Sung Jin | Lee Sung Jin | April 6, 2023 |
Injured after their car crashes, Amy and Danny attack each other, but are stranded with no cell phone reception. Amy forces Danny at gunpoint to forage for food, which leads them to consume poisonous berries. They become sick and dehydrated and, believing themselves to be dying, confide in each other and come to an understanding about their respective sadness. They survive and make their way back toward the city. Once they get phone reception back, Amy has dozens of messages and missed calls, and Danny learns that Paul is alive, though Paul does not want to speak to him. As they reach safety, Amy collapses, and Danny goes to help her up, but George appears and shoots Danny, seemingly believing that he is trying to harm Amy. Amy waits by Danny's hospital bed. A flashback to the road rage incident reveals that Amy hesitated for a few moments before deciding to give Danny the middle finger. Amy embraces Danny in the hospital bed as he lies unconscious. Days pass, and Danny returns her embrace.

=== Season 2 (2026) ===
| No. overall | No. in season | Title | Directed by | Written by | Original release date |
|---|---|---|---|---|---|
| 11 | 1 | "All the Things We're Never Going to Have" | Jake Schreier | Lee Sung Jin | April 16, 2026 |
After returning home from a fundraiser event, Josh Martín, the general manager of Monte Vista Point Country Club, and his wife, Lindsay, have a heated argument over Josh's increasing debt and their failing marriage. Meanwhile, Ashley, a beverage cart attendant at Monte Vista, and her fiancé, Austin, a personal trainer and part-time club employee, are asked to return Josh's wallet, which he left at the club. When they arrive at Josh and Lindsay's home, they witness the end of the argument. Lindsay had been breaking paintings and glass objects with a golf club before Josh tried to pull the golf club from her hands. Ashley records part of the confrontation on video before they hurriedly leave, believing that Josh was abusing Lindsay. The next day, Austin checks on Lindsay, who insists she is fine, and Josh subtly threatens Ashley. Josh prepares for the arrival of Chairwoman Park, the club's billionaire new owner. Ashley is diagnosed with an ovarian cyst and torsion after suffering abdominal pain at work. She tells Austin, who suggests using the video to blackmail Josh into paying for her medical treatment.
| 12 | 2 | "A New Starting Point for Further Desires" | Lee Sung Jin | Anna Ouyang Moench and Lee Sung Jin | April 16, 2026 |
Ashley and Austin blackmail Josh and Lindsay; in exchange for deleting the video, Ashley is promoted to a full-time managerial position with health insurance despite not having a high school diploma. Woosh, the club's tennis trainer, flirts with Lindsay in an attempt to sell her an expensive Korean cosmetic treatments, but Lindsay blackmails him with allegations of sexual harassment of the club's clients so she can get the procedures for free. After discovering that Ashley unwittingly submitted invoices for nonexistent vendors, Josh decides to make false invoices to a joint bank account with his recently deceased mother, Marta Díaz, so he can repay his debts, with Ashley as a potential scapegoat. Ashley staffs Chairwoman Park as she surveys the club for operational changes, and falsely says that Austin is a licensed physical therapist when Park suggests the club add one. Austin agrees to maintain the lie, and Ashley submits forged credentials to Josh, who fails to notice. Austin later visits Park's home for a trial session; she delegates her assistant, Eunice, to have it for her while she deals with a phone call from her husband, Dr. Kim, who has accidentally killed a patient during surgery.
| 13 | 3 | "The Increasing Flimsiness of Any Certainties about the Future" | Lee Sung Jin | Lee Sung Jin and Anna Ouyang Moench & Gene Hong | April 16, 2026 |
Park returns to Seoul to deal with her husband's lethal malpractice, but tight government financial scrutiny makes it difficult to fund bribes for the coverup. Eunice takes part in Austin's trial physical therapy session, which is intimate but not sexual. Feeling guilty, Austin later visits Eunice to withdraw his application, but suggests opening another role for him at the club. Josh and Lindsay plan to open a bed-and-breakfast using the embezzled money, but become hesitant after touring a similar property. Park discovers Josh's fraud and confronts him; she extends his contract as general manager for three years on the condition that he obey her without question. She then adopts the same scheme to fund her bribes. Ashley becomes suspicious about the invoices after discovering a condolence card addressed to Marta in Josh's office. At a staff meeting, Eunice confirms Josh will remain general manager and names Austin as the new full-time physical therapist and director of building a new wellness center. While driving home, Ashley and Austin argue over his sudden change of plans and attraction to Eunice; Ashley abruptly jumps out of their moving car and tumbles down a hill.
| 14 | 4 | "Oh, the Comfort, the Inexpressible Comfort" | Lee Sung Jin | Lee Sung Jin & Madeleine Pron | April 16, 2026 |
While waiting at the hospital, Ashley notices a new text from Eunice on Austin's phone while he is momentarily away; she intercepts it and pretends to be him before deleting the messages. Eunice sends Josh to visit Ashley, who offers to help expedite her treatment on the condition that she delete cloud backups of the video that he believes she has, but she refuses. Ashley also learns her employer-sponsored health insurance has a $5,000 deductible. Austin calls Eunice about a message sent after the deleted texts, and she recounts the exchanges she unknowingly had with Ashley, further straining Austin's trust in his fiancée. Ashley is admitted after her pain intensifies; she is taken into surgery, during which her ovary is removed. Afterward, a hospital representative tells the couple that Josh had arranged assistance for them, but it came too late. Devastated and enraged when Josh smugly texts her "You're welcome", Ashley takes revenge by sneaking into Josh and Lindsay's home, damaging Josh's trophies, photographing the fraudulent invoices that Park made him sign, and mixing some of her menstrual blood into a jug of juice. She accidentally leaves a door open, allowing Josh and Lindsay's dog, Burberry, to escape.
| 15 | 5 | "I Am Killing My Flesh without It" | Kitao Sakurai | Ethan Kuperberg and Lee Sung Jin | April 16, 2026 |
Josh and Lindsay return home and discover Burberry is missing. After an unsuccessful search, they adopt a similar-looking replacement dog, which leads to another argument as they revisit past grievances and blame each other for leaving the door open. Josh leaves for the club to distract himself with work, where Troy flies him to his ski chalet in Utah to party with the band Hot Chip. Meanwhile, Ashley and Austin help Lindsay search for Burberry. During the search, Ashley and Lindsay offer each other emotional support. Josh texts Lindsay to apologize, saying they process their feelings differently. Before she texts back to accept his apology and head home, Lindsay hears Burberry being attacked by a coyote; she kills the coyote to prevent it from coming after Burberry again and rushes Burberry to an animal hospital. Josh joins her there and agrees when she suggests their marriage is not working and they need a divorce. Burberry dies of his injuries, and Josh and Lindsay return home, where he chugs the jug of juice that Ashley had mixed with her blood.
| 16 | 6 | "Those Blue Remembered Hills" | Kitao Sakurai | Lee Sung Jin & Anna Ouyang Moench & Alex Russell | April 16, 2026 |
A month later, Park and her chief counsel decide to use Woosh's medical tourism packages to funnel money, leading the club to open a Trochos-branded spa. Josh and Lindsay try to proceed amicably with their divorce process, but Lindsay refuses to sign the papers upon learning that Josh has not signed his contract extension. Hoping to obtain Ashley's backup footage, Lindsay befriends Ashley by helping her persuade Troy's wife, Ava, to purchase a Trochos package in exchange for access to a respected IVF doctor. The two grow closer; Lindsay confesses her ulterior motive, but says she no longer wants anything from Ashley. Austin gives Josh a physical therapy session. Josh takes bufo and experiences a hallucinogenic trip; he later says he had hoped Austin would delete the backup footage, but no longer cares about it. As Austin leaves, Josh's neighbor recognizes his car as the one seen on the day Burberry disappeared. Eunice asks Ashley to help locate invoices, but Ashley redirects the matter to Woosh, who realizes the payments are bribes and asks Park to install him as company vice president. She agrees, but Woosh is struck by a car and killed upon his departure.
| 17 | 7 | "The Hour of Separation" | Lee Sung Jin | Lee Sung Jin & Carrie Kemper & Niko Gutierrez-Kovner | April 16, 2026 |
Ashley, Lindsay, and Ava depart for Seoul. Before leaving, Lindsay agrees to sign Josh's divorce papers after he signs his contract extension and agrees to all her requests. Park leaves her phone behind before going back to Seoul. Eunice finds it and learns the extent of Park's crimes. She visits Austin to tell him what she found. Park calls; the two say they will bring the phone to her in Korea. When Park cannot erase the device remotely, she starts to distrust Eunice. Austin joins Ashley on the flight, while Eunice tries to back up the phone's contents. She fears Park has people watching her and asks Austin for help finishing the backup, but Ashley overhears part of their conversation and suspects the two are having an affair. Ashley takes Park's phone, leading to an argument with Austin in the bathroom; Lindsay overhears Austin blames Ashley for Burberry's death. Furious, Lindsay takes Park's phone to the lavatory and flushes it. Austin tells Eunice he loves her and that he was planning to break up with Ashley. Back in California, Josh expects a date at his home but is attacked by an assassin.
| 18 | 8 | "It Will Stay This Way and You Will Obey" | Jake Schreier | Lee Sung Jin & Anna Ouyang Moench | April 16, 2026 |
Josh kills his attacker and flies to Korea. In Seoul, Eunice slips a USB to Austin before escaping Park's men. The next morning, Austin is unable to find the USB. Park's men abduct Josh from the airport, but Dr. Kim helps him escape. At the clinic, Dr. Kim tells Ashley, Lindsay, and Austin that he wants to help them expose Park, but Park discovers them; Dr. Kim is killed during their escape. The trio flee and reunite with Josh, allowing Park's men to recapture them. While in captivity, Josh and Lindsay reconcile, while Austin confronts Ashley about her abandonment issues and seems to end their relationship. After Ashley gives Austin the USB that she had stolen, Austin escapes, heading for the police and notifying Eunice. When she hesitates to reciprocate his romantic advances, he instead offers the USB to Park. Josh is arrested for embezzlement, Dr. Kim's death is ruled a suicide, and Park avoids punishment. Eight years later, Ashley manages the club and is married to Austin with a child, but tensions remain between them. Josh is released and chooses not to contact Lindsay, who has remarried and has a child. While visiting the grave of her first husband, Park says that wealth cannot buy time and reflects on her loneliness, while an overhead view modeled on saṃsāra reflects the characters' repeated patterns and fates.

== Production ==
Promotional poster for the first season

The project, created by Korean-American director Lee Sung Jin and starring Steven Yeun and Ali Wong, was first announced in March 2021. There was a bidding war over the series rights. Netflix won the rights. In December, Lee Isaac Chung was reported to be directing the pilot episode. In March 2022, additional castings were announced, including David Choe and Patti Yasutake, and the pilot episode would instead be directed by Japanese director Hikari. She was also confirmed to direct several additional episodes. Filming began by April 2022.

In April 2023, Lee said he planned for the series to last three seasons, saying: "There are a lot of ideas on my end to keep this story going. I think should we be blessed with a season two, there's a lot of ways for Danny and Amy to continue. I have one really big general idea that I can't really say yet, but I have three seasons mapped out in my head currently."

In February 2024, it was announced that a second season was being actively explored, with Charles Melton, Cailee Spaeny, Jake Gyllenhaal and Anne Hathaway. In June 2024, it was reported that Oscar Isaac and Carey Mulligan were in negotiations to star in the second season. In August 2024, Melton and Spaeny confirmed they were in negotiations to star in the second season. In October 2024, it was confirmed that Isaac, Mulligan, Melton, and Spaeny had been cast as the leads, with the story centering around "a young couple witnessing an alarming fight between their boss and his wife, triggering chess moves of favors and coercion in the elitist world of a country club and its Korean billionaire owner".

This marked the third collaboration for Isaac and Mulligan, after having co-starred in the films Drive (2011) and Inside Llewyn Davis (2013).

== Music ==
The first-season score is by Bobby Krlic. The second-season composer is Finneas O'Connell.

== Release ==
Beef premiered at South by Southwest on March 18, 2023. All 10 episodes were released on Netflix on April 6, 2023. The second season premiered on April 16, 2026.

== Reception ==
=== Critical response ===
Critical response of Beef
| Season | Rotten Tomatoes | Metacritic |
|---|---|---|
| 1 | 98% (125 reviews) | 86 (35 reviews) |
| 2 | 89% (88 reviews) | 77 (33 reviews) |

==== Season 1 ====
The first season of Beef received universal critical acclaim. On the review aggregator website Rotten Tomatoes, 98% of 125 critics' reviews are positive, with an average rating of 8.4/10. The website's consensus reads: "Ali Wong and Steven Yeun are a diabolically watchable pair of adversaries in Beef, a prime cut comedy that finds the pathos in pettiness. " Metacritic, which uses a weighted average, assigned a score of 86 out of 100, based on 35 critics, indicating "universal acclaim". Brian Tallerico of RogerEbert.com gave Beef 3.5 out of 4 stars. In his review, he noted that the general mood of the country, characterized by anxiety, frustration, and anger, was effectively used to create a "tonally daring" show that vacillates between comedy, drama, and thriller. Tallerico praised the show's well-structured plotting and lauded Yeun's and Wong's performances, calling them the best he had seen that year and applauding their ability to make their characters relatable and grounded. Tallerico also found the show's penultimate episode "a little hard-to-swallow" and felt it took some significant decisions away from the characters, which detracted from the narrative.

In her review for Variety, Alison Herman praised the chemistry between Wong and Yeun, as well as their performances. She wrote that the show starts grounded in emotional concerns but spirals ever further out into surrealism and caricatures, sometimes distracting from its "core insights". In her review for NPR, Linda Holmes wrote that the show is interested in big questions about meaning and purpose in life and "tackles them with inventiveness and deep empathy". She praised the show's stunning, surprising, and empathetic portrayal of the muddled humanity of its very messy characters and its ability to blend humor with deep existential questions. Holmes also praised the performances, especially Yeun's, and the production design.

Ben Travers of IndieWire gave the series a grade of B and wrote that it does a fine job balancing the protagonists' practical intelligence and impractical passions. He added that the series is designed to evoke empathy for each combatant while exploring their shared humanity and collective hardships, and it delves into their demons while drawing parallels between the two leads. He wrote that some of the plot twists feel forced, but Wong and Yeun "shine throughout". Ellen E. Jones of The Guardian gave the show 4 out of 5 stars and called it a "dark, existential thriller" and a "delicacy worth savouring". She wrote that the show's "extremely funny" dialogue and chaos highlights the quality of its leads.

In his review for The New York Times, James Poniewozik called Beef a "thrilling dark comedy" that "delves into the intricacies of anger via a road-rage feud between two drivers who share more in common than meets the eye". He praised the show's attention to the motivations that lead to the conflict and the personal and cultural specificity of its study of anger. Poniewozik also wrote that the show's Asian cast is both contingent on setting and integral to its themes. In the Chicago Sun-Times, Richard Roeper called Beef "bold, darkly funny, emotionally bruising, provocative and wicked-smart social satire". He commended the performances, particularly Wong's and Yeun's. Comparing the show to "Falling Down and Changing Lanes with a touch of The White Lotus", Roeper wrote that it was the best series he had seen all year.

==== Season 2 ====
The second season of Beef received generally positive reviews. On the review aggregator website Rotten Tomatoes, 89% of 88 critics' reviews are positive, with an average rating of 7.8/10. The website's consensus reads: "Beef pairs its second season with winning performers and a crackling sense of ingenuity in a saga that Lee Sung Jin perfectly anchors through his mastery of class satire and the unexpected modes of human nature. " On Metacritic, the second season received a score of 77 out of 100, based on 33 critics, indicating "generally favorable" reviews.

=== Viewership ===
The second season debuted at the number 10 spot on the Netflix Top 10 the week it was released, pulling in 2.4 million views, a drop of about 58% from the opening of season one.

=== Accolades ===
| Year | Award | Category | Recipient(s) | Result | Ref. |
|---|---|---|---|---|---|
| 2023 | Dorian TV Awards | Best TV Movie or Miniseries | Beef | Nominated | |
| 2023 | Dorian TV Awards | Best TV Performance – Comedy | Ali Wong | Nominated | |
| 2023 | Set Decorators Society of America TV Awards | Best Achievement in Décor/Design of a Half-Hour Single-Camera Series | Kellie Jo Tinney and Grace Yun | Nominated | |
| 2023 | TCA Awards | Outstanding Achievement in Movies, Miniseries, or Specials | Beef | Won | |
| 2023 | Hollywood Music in Media Awards | Best Original Score – TV Show/Limited Series | Bobby Krlic | Nominated | |
| 2023 | Gotham Awards | Breakthrough Television Under 40 Minutes | Beef | Won | |
| 2023 | Gotham Awards | Outstanding Performance in a New Series | Ali Wong | Won | |
| 2023 | Gotham Awards | Outstanding Performance in a New Series | Steven Yeun | Nominated | |
| 2023 | Celebration of Cinema & Television | Breakthrough Director – Television | Lee Sung Jin | Honored | |
| 2023 | American Film Institute Awards | Top 10 Television Programs | Beef | Won (Note: This award does not have a single winner, but recognizes multiple programs.) | |
| 2023 | IndieWire Honors | Visionary Award | Lee Sung Jin | Honored | |
| 2024 | Primetime Creative Arts Emmy Awards | Outstanding Casting for a Limited or Anthology Series or Movie | Charlene Lee and Claire Koonce | Won | |
| 2024 | Primetime Creative Arts Emmy Awards | Outstanding Contemporary Costumes for a Limited or Anthology Series or Movie | Helen Huang, Austin Wittick, YJ Hwang, and Mark Anthony Summers (for "The Birds Don't Sing, They Screech in Pain") | Won | |
| 2024 | Primetime Creative Arts Emmy Awards | Outstanding Picture Editing for a Limited or Anthology Series or Movie | Nat Fuller and Laura Zempel (for "Figures of Light") | Won | |
| 2024 | Primetime Creative Arts Emmy Awards | Outstanding Sound Mixing for a Limited or Anthology Series or Movie | Penny Harold, Andrew Garrett Lange, and Sean O'Malley (for "The Great Fabricator") | Nominated | |
| 2024 | Golden Globe Awards | Best Television Limited Series, Anthology Series, or Motion Picture Made for Television | Beef | Won | |
| 2024 | Golden Globe Awards | Best Performance by a Male Actor in a Limited Series, Anthology Series, or Motion Picture Made for Television | Steven Yeun | Won | |
| 2024 | Golden Globe Awards | Best Performance by a Female Actor in a Limited Series, Anthology Series, or Motion Picture Made for Television | Ali Wong | Won | |
| 2024 | Astra TV Awards | Best Streaming Limited Series | Beef | Won | |
| 2024 | Astra TV Awards | Best Actor in a Streaming Limited Series or TV Movie | Steven Yeun | Nominated | |
| 2024 | Astra TV Awards | Best Actress in a Streaming Limited Series or TV Movie | Ali Wong | Won | |
| 2024 | Astra TV Awards | Best Supporting Actor in a Limited Series or TV Movie | Young Mazino | Nominated | |
| 2024 | Astra TV Awards | Best Supporting Actress in a Limited Series or TV Movie | Maria Bello | Nominated | |
| 2024 | Astra TV Awards | Best Supporting Actress in a Limited Series or TV Movie | Ashley Park | Nominated | |
| 2024 | Astra TV Awards | Best Directing in a Streaming Limited Series or TV Movie | Lee Sung Jin (for "Figures of Light") | Won | |
| 2024 | Astra TV Awards | Best Writing in a Streaming Limited Series or TV Movie | Lee Sung Jin (for "The Birds Don't Sing, They Screech in Pain") | Nominated | |
| 2024 | Astra Creative Arts TV Awards | Best Casting in a Limited Series or TV Movie | Beef | Nominated | |
| 2024 | Critics' Choice Awards | Best Limited Series | Beef | Won | |
| 2024 | Critics' Choice Awards | Best Actor in a Limited Series or Movie Made for Television | Steven Yeun | Won | |
| 2024 | Critics' Choice Awards | Best Actress in a Limited Series or Movie Made for Television | Ali Wong | Won | |
| 2024 | Critics' Choice Awards | Best Supporting Actress in a Limited Series or Movie Made for Television | Maria Bello | Won | |
| 2024 | Primetime Emmy Awards | Outstanding Limited or Anthology Series | Lee Sung Jin, Steven Yeun, Ali Wong, Jake Schreier, Ravi Nandan, Alli Reich, Alice Ju, Carrie Kemper, Alex Russell, Jes Anderson, Savey Cathey, Inman Young, Alex Gayner, and Matthew Medlin | Won | |
| 2024 | Primetime Emmy Awards | Outstanding Lead Actor in a Limited or Anthology Series or Movie | Steven Yeun | Won | |
| 2024 | Primetime Emmy Awards | Outstanding Lead Actress in a Limited or Anthology Series or Movie | Ali Wong | Won | |
| 2024 | Primetime Emmy Awards | Outstanding Supporting Actor in a Limited or Anthology Series or Movie | Joseph Lee | Nominated | |
| 2024 | Primetime Emmy Awards | Outstanding Supporting Actor in a Limited or Anthology Series or Movie | Young Mazino | Nominated | |
| 2024 | Primetime Emmy Awards | Outstanding Supporting Actress in a Limited or Anthology Series or Movie | Maria Bello | Nominated | |
| 2024 | Primetime Emmy Awards | Outstanding Directing for a Limited or Anthology Series or Movie | Lee Sung Jin (for "Figures of Light") | Won | |
| 2024 | Primetime Emmy Awards | Outstanding Directing for a Limited or Anthology Series or Movie | Jake Schreier (for "The Great Fabricator") | Nominated | |
| 2024 | Primetime Emmy Awards | Outstanding Writing for a Limited or Anthology Series or Movie | Lee Sung Jin (for "The Birds Don't Sing, They Screech in Pain") | Won | |
| 2024 | AACTA International Awards | Best Drama Series | Beef | Nominated | |
| 2024 | AACTA International Awards | Best Actress in a Series | Ali Wong | Nominated | |
| 2024 | Art Directors Guild Awards | Excellence in Television Movie or Limited Series | Grace Yun | Won | |
| 2024 | People's Choice Awards | Bingeworthy Show of the Year | Beef | Nominated | |
| 2024 | People's Choice Awards | Comedy TV Star of the Year | Ali Wong | Nominated | |
| 2024 | People's Choice Awards | Female TV Star of the Year | Ali Wong | Nominated | |
| 2024 | People's Choice Awards | TV Performance of the Year | Steven Yeun | Nominated | |
| 2024 | Costume Designers Guild Awards | Excellence in Contemporary Television | Helen Huang (for "The Birds Don't Sing, They Screech in Pain") | Won | |
| 2024 | Screen Actors Guild Awards | Outstanding Performance by a Male Actor in a Miniseries or Television Movie | Steven Yeun | Won | |
| 2024 | Screen Actors Guild Awards | Outstanding Performance by a Female Actor in a Miniseries or Television Movie | Ali Wong | Won | |
| 2024 | Screen Actors Guild Awards | Outstanding Action Performance by a Stunt Ensemble in a Television Series | Charles Grisham and Eric C. Sun | Nominated | |
| 2024 | Film Independent Spirit Awards | Best New Scripted Series | Lee Sung Jin, Steven Yeun, Ali Wong, Jake Schreier, Ravi Nandan, Alli Reich, Alice Ju, and Carrie Kemper | Won | |
| 2024 | Film Independent Spirit Awards | Best Lead Performance in a New Scripted Series | Ali Wong | Won | |
| 2024 | Film Independent Spirit Awards | Best Lead Performance in a New Scripted Series | Steven Yeun | Nominated | |
| 2024 | Producers Guild of America Awards | Outstanding Producer of Limited or Anthology Series Television | Lee Sung Jin, Steven Yeun, Ali Wong, Jake Schreier, Ravi Nandan, Alli Reich, Carrie Kemper, Jes Anderson, Savey Cathey, Inman Young, Matthew Medlin, Alex Russell, and Alice Ju | Won | |
| 2024 | Cinema Audio Society Awards | Outstanding Achievement in Sound Mixing for Non-Theatrical Motion Pictures or Limited Series | Sean O'Malley, Penny Harold, Andrew Garrett Lange, and Andrey Starikovskiy (for "The Great Fabricator") | Nominated | |
| 2024 | ACE Eddie Awards | Best Edited Limited Series | Nat Fuller (for "The Great Fabricator") | Nominated | |
| 2024 | ACE Eddie Awards | Best Edited Limited Series | Harry Yoon and Laura Zempel (for "The Birds Don't Sing, They Screech in Pain") | Won | |
| 2024 | Golden Reel Awards | Outstanding Achievement in Music Editing – Broadcast Short Form | Jason Tregoe Newman, Bryant J. Fuhrman, and Andrew Ransom (for "The Great Fabricator") | Nominated | |
| 2024 | Golden Reel Awards | Outstanding Achievement in Sound Editing – Broadcast Short Form | Christopher Gomez, Jerry Lafuente, Nathan Efstation, Igor Yashin, and Ruslan Schebisty (for "The Great Fabricator") | Nominated | |
| 2024 | Satellite Awards | Best Miniseries & Limited Series or Motion Picture Made for Television | Beef | Nominated | |
| 2024 | Satellite Awards | Best Actor in a Miniseries, Limited Series, or Motion Picture Made for Television | Steven Yeun | Nominated | |
| 2024 | Satellite Awards | Best Actress in a Miniseries, Limited Series, or Motion Picture Made for Television | Ali Wong | Nominated | |
| 2024 | Artios Awards | Outstanding Achievement in Casting – Limited Series | Charlene Lee, Claire Koonce, and Danny Gordon | Won | |
| 2024 | NAACP Image Awards | Outstanding Actress in a Television Movie, Limited Series or Dramatic Special | Ali Wong | Nominated | |
| 2024 | NAACP Image Awards | Outstanding Writing in a Drama Series | Lee Sung Jin | Nominated | |
| 2024 | Writers Guild of America Awards | Limited Series | Joanna Calo, Bathsheba Doran, Jean Kyoung Frazier, Niko Gutierrez-Kovner, Lee Sung Jin, Alice Ju, Carrie Kemper, Mike Makowsky, Marie Hanhnhon Nguyen, Kevin Rosen, and Alex Russell | Won | |
| 2024 | British Academy Television Awards | Best International Programme | Lee Sung Jin, Steven Yeun, Ali Wong, Jake Schreier, Ravi Nandan, and Alli Reich | Nominated | |
| 2024 | Academy of Television Arts & Sciences | Television Academy Honors Award | Beef | Honored | |
| 2026 | Gotham TV Awards | Outstanding Limited or Anthology Series | Lee Sung Jin, Sam French, Oscar Isaac, Ethan Kuperberg, Charles Melton, Anna Ouyang Moench, Carey Mulligan, Ravi Nandan, Alli Reich, Kitao Sakurai, Jake Schreier, Cailee Spaeny, Ali Wong, and Steven Yeun | Nominated | |
| 2026 | Gotham TV Awards | Outstanding Lead Performance in a Limited or Anthology Series | Carey Mulligan | Nominated | |
| 2026 | Gotham TV Awards | Outstanding Supporting Performance in a Limited or Anthology Series | Cailee Spaeny | Nominated | |
| 2026 | IndieWire Honors | Performance Award | Charles Melton | Honored | |
| 2026 | AAFCA TV Honors | Top 10 Television Programs | Beef | 9th place | |
| 2026 | Set Decorators Society of America TV Awards | Best Achievement in Décor/Design of a Television Movie or Limited Series | Kellie Jo Tinney and Grace Yun | Won | |
| 2026 | Astra TV Awards | Best Limited Series | Beef | Won | |
| 2026 | Astra TV Awards | Best Actor in a Limited Series or TV Movie | Oscar Isaac | Won | |
| 2026 | Astra TV Awards | Best Actress in a Limited Series or TV Movie | Carey Mulligan | Nominated | |
| 2026 | Astra TV Awards | Best Supporting Actor in a Limited Series or TV Movie | Charles Melton | Won | |
| 2026 | Astra TV Awards | Best Supporting Actress in a Limited Series or TV Movie | Cailee Spaeny | Nominated | |
| 2026 | Astra TV Awards | Best Supporting Actress in a Limited Series or TV Movie | Youn Yuh-jung | Nominated | |
| 2026 | Astra TV Awards | Best Directing in a Limited Series or TV Movie | Beef | Won | |
| 2026 | Astra TV Awards | Best Writing in a Limited Series or TV Movie | Beef | Nominated | |
| 2026 | Astra TV Awards | Best Limited Series or TV Movie Cast Ensemble | Beef | Won | |
| 2026 | Dorian TV Awards | Best TV Movie or Limited Series | Beef | Nominated | |
| 2026 | Dorian TV Awards | Best Supporting TV Performance – Drama | Charles Melton | Nominated | |
| 2026 | TCA Awards | Outstanding Achievement in Movies, Miniseries, or Specials | Beef | Nominated | |
| 2026 | Location Managers Guild International Awards | Outstanding Locations in a TV Anthology, Movie, or Limited Series | Beef | Nominated | |
| 2026 | Primetime Creative Arts Emmy Awards | Outstanding Supporting Actor in a Limited or Anthology Series or Movie | Charles Melton | Nominated | |
| 2026 | Primetime Creative Arts Emmy Awards | Outstanding Supporting Actress in a Limited or Anthology Series or Movie | Youn Yuh-jung | Nominated | |
| 2026 | Primetime Creative Arts Emmy Awards | Outstanding Directing for a Limited or Anthology Series or Movie | Jake Schreier (for "It Will Stay This Way and You Will Obey") | Nominated | |
| 2026 | Primetime Creative Arts Emmy Awards | Outstanding Directing for a Limited or Anthology Series or Movie | Lee Sung Jin (for "Oh, the Comfort, the Inexpressible Comfort") | Nominated | |
| 2026 | Primetime Creative Arts Emmy Awards | Outstanding Writing for a Limited or Anthology Series or Movie | Lee Sung Jin (for "All the Things We're Never Going to Have") | Nominated | |
| 2026 | Primetime Creative Arts Emmy Awards | Outstanding Cinematography for a Limited or Anthology Series or Movie | James Laxton (for "It Will Stay This Way and You Will Obey") | Nominated | |
| 2026 | Primetime Creative Arts Emmy Awards | Outstanding Casting for a Limited or Anthology Series or Movie | Jeanie Bacharach | Nominated | |
| 2026 | Primetime Creative Arts Emmy Awards | Outstanding Contemporary Costumes for a Limited or Anthology Series or Movie | Olga Mill, Bailey Gardner, Sarah Basta, and Kellie Ishisaki (for "All the Things We're Never Going to Have") | Won | |
| 2026 | Primetime Creative Arts Emmy Awards | Outstanding Picture Editing for a Limited or Anthology Series or Movie | Lauren Connelly (for "The Increasing Flimsiness of Any Certainties About the Future") | Nominated | |
| 2026 | Primetime Creative Arts Emmy Awards | Outstanding Picture Editing for a Limited or Anthology Series or Movie | Laura Zempel (for "All the Things We're Never Going to Have") | Nominated | |
| 2026 | Primetime Creative Arts Emmy Awards | Outstanding Sound Editing for a Limited or Anthology Series, Movie, or Special | Christopher Gomez, Danika Wikke, Jerry Lafuente, Yurii Kerelius, Luke Dennis, and Danylo Gomlez (for "It Will Stay This Way and You Will Obey") | Won | |
| 2026 | Primetime Creative Arts Emmy Awards | Outstanding Sound Mixing for a Limited or Anthology Series or Movie | Penny Harold, Andy Lange, Devendra Cleary, Sean O'Malley, Jongkun Park, Judah Getz, and Illia Popel (for "It Will Stay This Way and You Will Obey") | Won | |
| 2026 | Primetime Creative Arts Emmy Awards | Outstanding Stunt Coordination for Comedy Programming | Shauna Duggins and Chris O'Hara | Nominated | |
| 2026 | Primetime Emmy Awards | Outstanding Limited or Anthology Series | Lee Sung Jin, Oscar Isaac, Carey Mulligan, Cailee Spaeny, Charles Melton, Jake Schreier, Anna Ouyang Moench, Kitao Sakurai, Steven Yeun, Ali Wong, Ravi Nandan, Sam French, Alli Reich, Ethan Kuperberg, Alex Russell, Carrie Kemper, Dana Scott, Gene Hong, Sabrina Mahfouz, Joshua Gonzales, Jes Anderson, and Reuben Lim | Nominated | |
| 2026 | Primetime Emmy Awards | Outstanding Lead Actor in a Limited or Anthology Series or Movie | Oscar Isaac | Nominated | |
| 2026 | Primetime Emmy Awards | Outstanding Lead Actress in a Limited or Anthology Series or Movie | Carey Mulligan | Nominated | |
| 2026 | Humanitas Prize | Limited Series Teleplay | Lee Sung Jin and Madeleine Pron (for "Oh, the Comfort, the Inexpressible Comfort") | Nominated | |
| 2026 | World Soundtrack Awards | Television Composer of the Year | Finneas O'Connell (for "Season 2") | Nominated | |
| 2026 | Seoul International Drama Awards | Best Miniseries | Beef | Nominated | |
| 2026 | Seoul International Drama Awards | Best Director | Lee Sung Jin and Jake Schreier | Nominated | |
| 2026 | Seoul International Drama Awards | Best Actor | Charles Melton | Nominated | |
| 2026 | Seoul International Drama Awards | Best Actress | Carey Mulligan | Nominated | |
