= Lee Sung Jin =

American writer and director

- 이성진
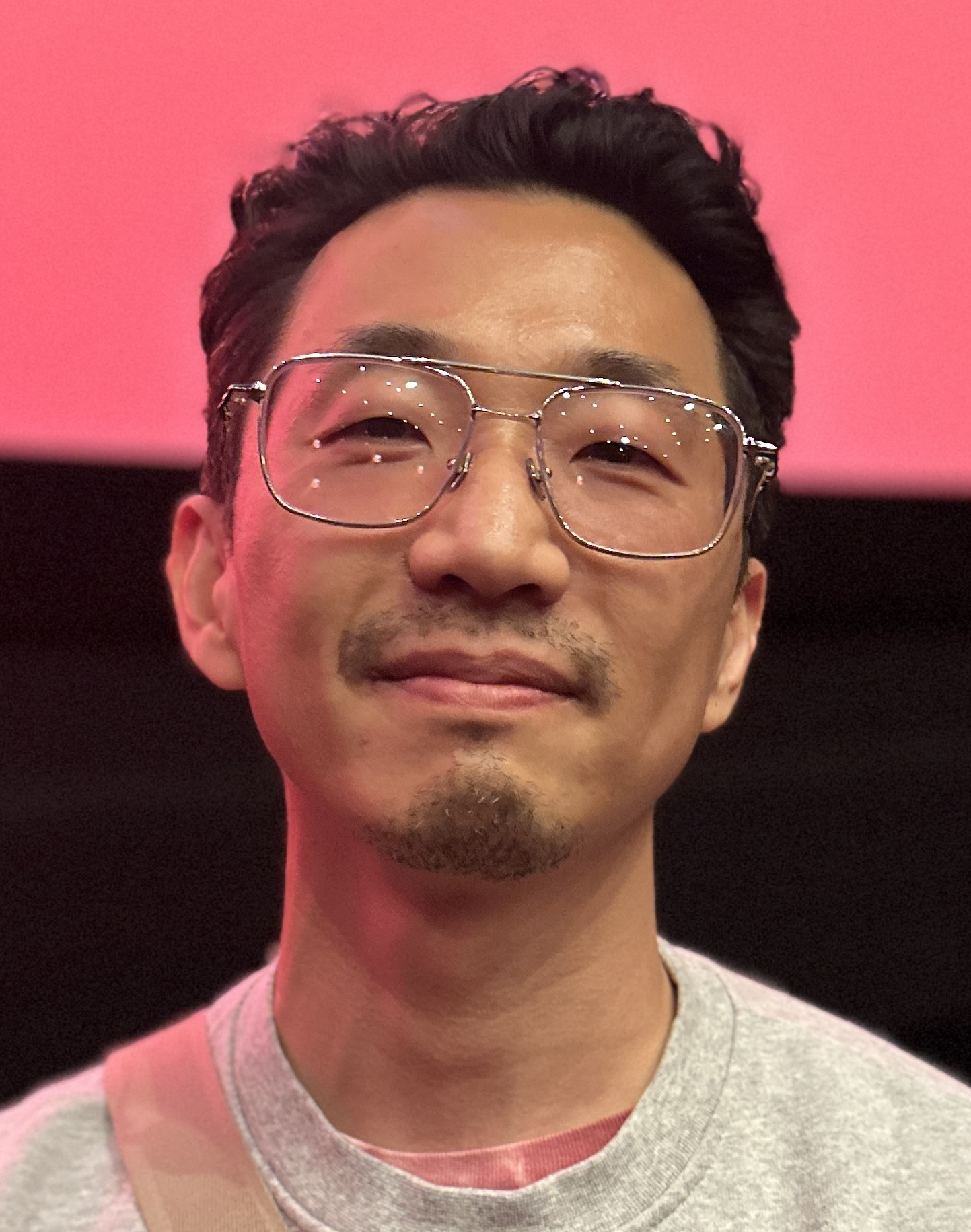
- Lee in 2025
- Born: October 2, 1981 (age 44); Seoul, South Korea
- Other name: Sonny Lee
- Education: University of Pennsylvania (BA)
- Occupations: Screenwriter; director
- Years active: 2007–present
- Known for: Beef
- Spouse: Caty Solone

Korean name
- Hangul: 이성진
- Hanja: 李成震
- RR: I Seongjin
- MR: I Sŏngjin

Lee Sung Jin (Korean: 이성진; born October 2, 1981), also known as Sonny Lee, is a South Korean-American screenwriter and director. He is best known for creating the Netflix series Beef, for which he received the 2023 Primetime Emmy Awards for directing and writing for a limited series. He also contributed to the script of the 2025 Marvel Studios superhero film Thunderbolts*, and is developing a new X-Men film for the studio with frequent collaborators Jake Schreier and Joanna Calo.

== Early life and education ==
Lee Sung Jin was born in South Korea in 1981. His family moved frequently in his youth; he moved to the United States when he was nine months old and returned to South Korea for third through fifth grade. In sixth grade he moved from Seoul to Minnesota, United States. He also lived in Illinois, Louisiana, Iowa, and Texas. He recalls it as “a horrible time to have a name no one can pronounce" and chose to go by "Sonny" instead.

Lee attended the University of Pennsylvania, where he sang in an a cappella group. He graduated in 2003 with a degree in economics.

== Career ==
After graduating from college, Lee moved to Los Angeles and worked a variety of part-time jobs while writing scripts. He interned at the record label Barsuk Records. He wrote for the series Undone, Tuca & Bertie, Dave, and Silicon Valley. In 2008, he worked as a staff writer and executive story editor for It's Always Sunny in Philadelphia.

He was inspired to create Beef by a road-rage confrontation with a middle-aged white man in Los Angeles. "I thought there was something interesting there—how we're all locked in our subjective world views, and we go around projecting a lot on the other person and not really seeing things for what they are", he said of the incident. He also served as director, executive producer, and showrunner on the series, forced to remotely direct scenes for the season finale "with my face on an iPad" because of a COVID-19 infection.

In August 2023, he visited South Korea to speak at a conference on the creation of films. He said he had not been to South Korea for around 25 years, since his childhood.

In November 2023, Variety reported that Lee had signed a multiyear deal to produce content for Netflix.

In 2023, Lee was reported to have joined the 2025 Marvel Cinematic Universe film Thunderbolts* as a writer, saying in an interview, "I'm rewriting it." In a later interview with The Hollywood Reporter, he said he was "working off an existing script from Eric Pearson and I did my pass on it" before stepping away from the project and handing it off to Joanna Calo, who worked with him on Beef. The film credits the screenplay to Pearson and Calo, with the story by Pearson. According to the Writers Guild of America West, Lee received credit for "Additional Literary Material".

Lee wrote, directed, and produced the video for BTS leader RM's "Come Back to Me", a prerelease track from his second solo album, Right Place, Wrong Person, released in 2024.

In April 2026, it was confirmed by Jake Schreier that Lee Sung Jin was co-writing the screenplay for the upcoming X-Men film being produced by Marvel Studios alongside Joanna Calo after the pair previously worked on Thunderbolts*, revising the original script by Michael Lesslie. The same month, he renewed his overall deal with Netflix. In an interview, Lee Sung Jin said he is writing and directing a film with Steven Yeun that he describes as “There Will Be Blood meets The Informant meets Tarkovsky’s Stalker.”

== Personal life ==
Lee lives in Los Angeles with his wife, Caty Solone, and three dogs. He plays the violin, guitar, and piano.

== Selected filmography ==
=== Film ===
Year	Title	Director	Writer	Notes
2025	Thunderbolts*	No	Uncredited	Additional Literary Material

=== Television ===
Year	Title	Creator	Director	Writer	Executive producer	Notes
2007–2008	Rob & Big	No	No	Consultant Writer	No	24 episodes
2008–2009	It's Always Sunny in Philadelphia	No	No	Executive Story Editor	No	26 episodes
2010	Mothman	Yes	No	Yes	No	TV movie; co-screenwriter
2010–2014	2 Broke Girls	No	No	Yes	No	7 episodes
2015	Silicon Valley	No	No	Yes	No	Episode: "Server Space"
2016	The Real O'Neals	No	No	Yes	No	Episode: "The Real Book Club"
2018	Tuca & Bertie	No	No	Yes	No	2 episodes
2021	Dave	No	No	Yes	No	2 episodes
2023–present	Beef	Yes	Yes	Yes	Yes	Also showrunner; director: "Figures of Light"

=== Music videos ===
Year	Artist	Title	Director	Writer	Producer	Notes
2024	RM	"Come Back to Me"	Yes	Yes	Yes	

== Awards and nominations ==
Award	Date of ceremony	Category	Work	Result	Ref.
Primetime Emmy Awards	September 20, 2015	Outstanding Comedy Series	Silicon Valley	Nominated	
Primetime Emmy Awards	January 15, 2024	Outstanding Writing for a Limited or Anthology Series or Movie	Beef (episode "The Birds Don't Sing, They Screech in Pain")	Won	
Primetime Emmy Awards	January 15, 2024	Outstanding Directing for a Limited or Anthology Series or Movie	Beef (episode "Figures of Light")	Won	
Primetime Emmy Awards	January 15, 2024	Outstanding Limited or Anthology Series	Beef	Won	
Golden Globe Awards	January 7, 2024	Best Limited Series, Anthology Series, or Motion Picture Made for Television	Beef	Won	
Critics Choice Awards	January 14, 2024	Best Limited Series	Beef	Won	
AFI Awards	January 5, 2024	Television Programs of the Year	Beef	Won	
Television Academy Honors	May 30, 2024	Limited Series	Beef	Won	
Astra TV Awards	January 8, 2024	Best Streaming Limited Series	Beef	Won	
Astra TV Awards	January 8, 2024	Best Writing in a Limited Series or Streaming Movie	Beef (episode "The Birds Don't Sing, They Screech in Pain")	Nominated	
Astra TV Awards	January 8, 2024	Best Directing in a Limited Series or Streaming Movie	Beef (episode "Figures of Light")	Won	
Television Critics Association Awards	August 7, 2023	Outstanding Achievement in Movies, Miniseries or Specials	Beef	Won	
People's Choice Awards	February 18, 2024	The Bingeworthy Show of the Year	Beef	Nominated	
The Unforgettable Gala	December 16, 2023	Writer of the Year	Beef	Won	
Gold House	May 29, 2024	Gold Icon Award	Beef	Won	
IndieWire Honors	December 7, 2023	Visionary Award in Television	Beef	Won	
BAFTA Television Awards	May 12, 2024	International	Beef	Nominated	
Gotham Awards	November 27, 2023	Breakthrough Series (Under 40 minutes)	Beef	Won	
NAACP Image Awards	March 16, 2024	Outstanding Writing in a Drama Series	Beef	Nominated	
Film Independent Spirit Awards	February 25, 2024	Best New Scripted Series	Beef	Won	
PGA Awards	February 25, 2024	Outstanding Producer of Limited or Anthology Series Television	Beef	Won	
WGA Awards	February 13, 2016	Television: Comedy Series	Silicon Valley	Nominated	
WGA Awards	March 5, 2023	Television: Episodic Comedy	Dave (episode "Enlightened Dave")	Nominated	
WGA Awards	April 14, 2024	Limited Series	Beef	Won	
