= Mr. & Mrs. Smith (2024 TV series) =

American spy comedy-drama television series

- Promo Image
- Genre: Anthology; Spy; Action thriller; Romantic comedy
- Created by: Francesca Sloane; Donald Glover
- Inspired by: Mr. & Mrs. Smith by Simon Kinberg
- Showrunners: Francesca Sloane; Anna Ouyang Moench
- Starring: Donald Glover; Maya Erskine; Mark Eydelshteyn; Talia Ryder
- Music by: David Fleming
- Country of origin: United States
- Original language: English
- No. of seasons: 1
- No. of episodes: 8

Production
- Executive producers: Donald Glover; Francesca Sloane; Stephen Glover; Hiro Murai; Nate Matteson; Anthony Katagas; Arnon Milchan; Yariv Milchan; Michael Schaefer
- Producers: Christian Sprenger; Fam Udeorji; Kaitlin Waldron
- Cinematography: Christian Sprenger; Stephen Murphy; Cody Jacobs
- Editors: Kyle Reiter; Isaac Hagy; Greg O'Bryant; Kate Brokaw
- Running time: 42–63 minutes
- Production companies: Gilga; Super Frog; Big Indie Pictures; New Regency; 20th Television; Amazon MGM Studios

Original release
- Network: Amazon Prime Video
- Release: February 2, 2024 – present

Mr. & Mrs. Smith is an American spy anthology television series created by Francesca Sloane and Donald Glover, which premiered on February 2, 2024. It is inspired by the 2005 film Mr. & Mrs. Smith written by Simon Kinberg, although instead of following a married couple of competing spies like the film, the series stars Glover and Maya Erskine as two strangers paired up as a duo of spies who must live undercover as a married couple; instead of real names, John and Jane Smith are aliases given to the characters and the other agents working for the same organization.

Arnon Milchan, who was a producer on the original film, is an executive producer for the series alongside, among others, Sloane, Glover, Glover's brother Stephen, Hiro Murai, Anthony Katagas, and Michael Schaefer. The series was renewed for a second season with Anna Ouyang Moench taking over as showrunner.

The show received positive reviews from critics, who particularly praised the performances and Glover and Erskine's chemistry. It received 16 Primetime Emmy Award nominations for its first season, including nominations for Outstanding Drama Series, Outstanding Lead Actor for Glover, Outstanding Lead Actress for Erskine, and five acting nominations for some of the featured guests.

== Premise ==
Two strangers independently agree to become secret agents for a mysterious organization under cover as a married couple using the names "John" and "Jane" Smith. The couple must work through missions as their espionage skills, and developing relationship, are put to the test. All instructions are received from an anonymous source via text. The Smiths take on a separate mission in each of eight episodes and the show features different locales while also focusing on the marital relationship the two characters assume.

== Cast ==
=== Main ===
==== Season 1 ====
- Donald Glover as John Smith / Michael
- Maya Erskine as Jane Smith / Alana

==== Season 2 ====
- Mark Eydelshteyn as Mr. Smith
- Talia Ryder as Mrs. Smith

=== Guest ===
==== Season 1 ====
- Alexander Skarsgård as First Other John
- Eiza González as First Other Jane
- Paul Dano as Harris Materbach
- John Turturro as Eric Shane
- Sharon Horgan as Gavol Martin
- Billy Campbell as Parker Martin
- Sarah Paulson as Therapist
- Parker Posey as Second Other Jane
- Úrsula Corberó as Runi
- Wagner Moura as Second Other John
- Ron Perlman as Toby Hellinger
- Michaela Coel as Bev

Additionally, Beverly Glover, who is Donald's mother in real life, makes her acting debut as Denise, John Smith's mother.

==== Season 2 ====
- Francesca Scorsese as Another Jane
- Matt Rogers as Another John
- Levon Hawke
- Yonatan Gebeyehu

== Episodes ==
| No. | Title | Directed by | Written by | Original release date |
|---|---|---|---|---|
| 1 | "First Date" | Hiro Murai | Francesca Sloane & Donald Glover | February 2, 2024 |
A couple named "John" and "Jane" are shot dead by armed intruders. Later, two strangers undergo an interview for a mysterious organization and are hired to sever ties with their pasts to become spies; "John" and "Jane" Smith at a "high risk" level. For their first mission, they are instructed to intercept a package and deliver it to a set location. John and Jane tentatively bond as they deliver what turns out to be a bomb that explodes and kills the inhabitants of the home.
| 2 | "Second Date" | Hiro Murai | Francesca Sloane | February 2, 2024 |
John and Jane begin to cautiously open up to each other, setting initial boundaries against sleeping together and plan to eventually go their separate ways. Their next mission is to infiltrate a black tie silent auction and discreetly extract information from an unknown target who is bidding on Silver Car Crash (Double Disaster). Despite successfully identifying the target as Eric Shane, miscommunication leads to them overdosing him with truth serum, which results in his death. Their handler informs them that this was their first failed mission and that they have two fails remaining. Subsequent emotions and bonding leads the duo breaking their earlier agreement and sleeping together.
| 3 | "First Vacation" | Karena Evans | Yvonne Hana Yi | February 2, 2024 |
The Smiths' next mission sends them to the Italian Dolomites to observe and report on couple Gavol and Parker Martin. John and Jane bond further throughout their mission, but tensions emerge when it is revealed that John remains in constant contact with his mother, which is against the rules. Splitting up to follow and extract information from each target, John attempts a rescue operation when Gavol is kidnapped, despite having already completed his mission by bugging her phone. After rescuing Gavol and eliminating the kidnappers, John, freezing and near death, is saved by Jane. While recovering, they admit they are beginning to have deep feelings for each other.
| 4 | "Double Date" | Christian Sprenger | Adamma Ebo & Adanne Ebo and Yvonne Hana Yi & Francesca Sloane | February 2, 2024 |
John and Jane come across another pair of Smiths, who operate at the "super high risk" level. They invite the other Smiths over on a double date at their house, where the two couples discuss missions, lifestyles, romance and the company. Upon bringing up their agreement to eventually go separate ways and quit, the other Smiths indicate their employer would never allow this and discuss a previous elimination of another Jane and John. The Smiths are talked into accompanying them on a "super high risk" mission, but are tricked into completing it themselves. Despite successfully completing the mission, they are left traumatized. Later that night they admit they love each other.
| 5 | "Do You Want Kids?" | Karena Evans | Carla Ching and Stephen Glover | February 2, 2024 |
John and Jane must protect and escort Toby Hellinger, an asset of apparently high importance to the company. They are ambushed upon arrival at the safe house and, after evading their pursuers, hide out at a property John had bought, without Jane's knowledge. Their handler asks Jane whether she is happy. Toby and the events of the day lead the Smiths to discuss their future. The next morning, they escape an ambush and Jane blows up the house as they take Toby to a seaplane pick-up. At home the Smiths discuss having kids, which John wants, but Jane is against. Tensions rise as their handler singles out Jane's success, and gives her the option of replacing John.
| 6 | "Couples Therapy (Naked & Afraid)" | Amy Seimetz | Francesca Sloane | February 2, 2024 |
John and Jane attend multiple sessions of couples therapy. They discuss their work and relationship under the guise of software engineers. Throughout therapy, flashbacks show multiple missions which have led to further tension between the couple: one where John attempts to take the lead of an infiltration, a later chase and execution of a target, and a tracking wilderness mission which results in their second fail. John expresses how he misses Jane looking up to him, and Jane discusses John's behavior and her beliefs of compatibility. The therapist suggests working separately, before revealing she has been recording every session. To destroy any copies, the Smiths set the house on fire as they leave.
| 7 | "Infidelity" | Amy Seimetz | Yvonne Hana Yi & Schuyler Pappas & Francesca Sloane | February 2, 2024 |
John and Jane now work missions separately. Jane infiltrates and, at gunpoint, interrogates their neighbor Bev about her relationship to John, who she assumes Bev is sleeping with. John arrives and Bev, who is revealed to be a spy working for a rival company and John's target, attacks both of them before escaping, nearly killing John. They track Bev but she dumps her tracker at the café where the Smiths had their first mission and disappears. They realize the company supplied them with the information on each other's actions and locations; it becomes clear the company has been trying to cause a rift between the two. Now with three fails, they are instructed to await further instructions. John concedes he is done and leaves. Jane smashes John's computer in anger and a new one is ominously delivered the next morning.
| 8 | "A Breakup" | Donald Glover | Francesca Sloane & Donald Glover | February 2, 2024 |
Jane is instructed to terminate John. Jane is shot at and her cat Max is killed, while John discovers tripwire and C-4 at his mother's house. They agree to meet up, both blaming the other. Jane nearly kills John with a bomb, but he escapes and gives chase. Jane makes it home to find John's mother, who reveals his real name as Michael and seeks to give Jane advice against breaking up with him, before leaving. John uses the neighbor's house to gain access to his house. Using weapons hidden throughout the house, the duo fight to the point of exhaustion. John ultimately prevails, and injects them both with truth serum. Delirious, they both admit they had the chance to but chose not to kill each other and they loved each other, among other personal secrets. They realize neither of them were behind the earlier attempts on their lives, as the Smiths they previously met enter the house to kill them. The other Smiths reveal "super high risk" is the execution of Smiths, and their belief that the company is omniscient. Jane incapacitates the other John with a headshot and escapes to the safe room with a badly wounded John. While the other Jane is trying to get access to the safe room, Jane agrees to have kids, reveals her real name as Alana, and with one bullet left makes her final stand. Outside the building, three shots are seen fired. In a post credit scene, the neighbor, a real estate agent who wants to sell the property, is trying to deliver a book and rejoices at the sight of the destroyed home, hoping to be finally be able to sell their house.

== Production ==
On February 12, 2021, it was announced that a TV series reboot based on the original film, created by and starring Donald Glover and Phoebe Waller-Bridge, with Francesca Sloane as co-creator and showrunner, would premiere on Prime Video in 2022. The original film was directed by Doug Liman and starred Brad Pitt and Angelina Jolie. Waller-Bridge exited the project in September 2021 due to creative differences with Glover. On April 7, 2022, it was reported that Maya Erskine would take over Waller-Bridge's role.

On June 29, 2022, it was reported that Michaela Coel, John Turturro, and Paul Dano would appear in guest star roles. On September 22, 2022, it was reported that Parker Posey and Wagner Moura had joined the cast in recurring roles.

In addition to Glover and Sloane, the series was executive produced by Yariv Milchan, Arnon Milchan, Michael Schaefer, Stephen Glover, Anthony Katagas, Hiro Murai, Nate Matteson, and Jenny Robins. Filming began in the summer of 2022.

On May 14, 2024, Amazon Prime Video renewed the series for a second season, with Sloane returning as showrunner. However, whether Glover and Erskine are returning or not is unclear. On December 6, 2024, it was announced that Mark Eydelshteyn was cast to star for the second season. On February 14, 2025, it was announced that Sophie Thatcher was in talks to star for the second season. On July 2, 2025, it was reported that the second season is set to be filmed in Los Angeles. The first season was filmed in New York and Italy. Production for the second season had to be postponed in September 2025 due to issues with the cast, and during the delay Sloane's overall deal with Amazon MGM studios ended. Anna Ouyang Moench was hired to be the showrunner for season two as the production got ready to resume in early 2026 to preserve the California tax credit it would receive for relocating the production. In April 2026, it was reported that production had begun, with Talia Ryder taking over Thatcher who had to leave due to scheduling conflicts with Yellowjackets' final season. On May 19, 2026, it was reported that Francesca Scorsese joined the cast while Glover was set to direct multiple episodes for the second season. In June 2026, it was announced that Matt Rogers and Levon Hawke were added to the cast for the second season. In September 2026, Yonatan Gebeyehu joined the cast.

== Release ==
On September 23, 2022, it was reported that the release date for the series had been pushed back from 2022 to 2023.

Amidst the 2023 Hollywood strikes, Amazon delayed the release from 2023 to "early 2024". All eight episodes of the series were released on February 2, 2024, on Prime Video.

== Marketing ==
A series of guerrilla marketing stunts were used to promote the series. On January 19, 2024, a pair of shoes were stolen at an art exhibit after the lights went out. On January 24, two furries sat next to Tyra Banks at a basketball game. On January 25, a comedy show featuring Mark Normand was interrupted when two unknown people rushed the stage. Social media posts about these events had advertisement disclaimers but did not specify the product being advertised. Gothamist found that marketing firm Verb had put out casting calls for the "HiHi Mission Contest" that would take place at a "culture event in New York City". The comedy show was a taping by HiHi, according to the comedy club, that influencers had been invited to.

== Reception ==
=== Critical response ===
The review aggregator website Rotten Tomatoes reported an 91% approval rating, with an average rating of 7.6/10, based on 119 critic reviews. The website's critics consensus reads, "Building on the basic premise of its source material, Mr. & Mrs. Smith anchors its spy hijinks in a relationship drama fueled by the chemistry between its charming leads." On Metacritic, the series holds a weighted average score of 76 out of 100, based on 38 critics, indicating "generally favorable reviews".

=== Audience viewership ===
On February 9, 2024, it was announced the series had become one of Prime Video's top five new series debuts ever in terms of total U.S. viewers.

=== Awards and nominations ===
| Year | Award | Category | Nominee(s) | Result | Ref. |
|---|---|---|---|---|---|
| 2024 | Gotham TV Awards | Breakthrough Drama Series | Mr. & Mrs. Smith | Won | |
| 2024 | Television Critics Association Awards | Outstanding New Program | Mr. & Mrs. Smith | Nominated | |
| 2024 | Astra TV Awards | Best Streaming Drama Series | Mr. & Mrs. Smith | Nominated | |
| 2024 | Astra TV Awards | Best Actor in a Streaming Drama Series | Donald Glover | Nominated | |
| 2024 | Astra TV Awards | Best Actress in a Streaming Drama Series | Maya Erskine | Nominated | |
| 2024 | Astra TV Awards | Best Guest Actor in a Drama Series | Paul Dano | Nominated | |
| 2024 | Astra TV Awards | Best Guest Actor in a Drama Series | Wagner Moura | Nominated | |
| 2024 | Astra TV Awards | Best Guest Actor in a Drama Series | Ron Perlman | Nominated | |
| 2024 | Astra TV Awards | Best Guest Actress in a Drama Series | Michaela Coel | Won | |
| 2024 | Astra TV Awards | Best Guest Actress in a Drama Series | Sarah Paulson | Nominated | |
| 2024 | Astra TV Awards | Best Guest Actress in a Drama Series | Parker Posey | Nominated | |
| 2024 | Astra TV Awards | Best Directing in a Streaming Drama Series | Hiro Murai (for "First Date") | Won | |
| 2024 | Astra TV Awards | Best Writing in a Streaming Drama Series | Francesca Sloane and Donald Glover (for "First Date") | Won | |
| 2024 | Black Reel Awards | Outstanding Drama Series | Mr. & Mrs. Smith | Won | |
| 2024 | Black Reel Awards | Outstanding Lead Performance in a Drama Series | Donald Glover | Nominated | |
| 2024 | Black Reel Awards | Outstanding Guest Performance in a Drama Series | Michaela Coel | Won | |
| 2024 | Black Reel Awards | Outstanding Directing in a Drama Series | Donald Glover (for "A Breakup") | Nominated | |
| 2024 | Black Reel Awards | Outstanding Writing in a Drama Series | Francesca Sloane & Donald Glover (for "A Breakup") | Nominated | |
| 2024 | Black Reel Awards | Outstanding Writing in a Drama Series | Francesca Sloane & Donald Glover (for "First Date") | Nominated | |
| 2024 | Primetime Emmy Awards | Outstanding Drama Series | Donald Glover, Francesca Sloane, Stephen Glover, Hiro Murai, Nate Matteson, Anthony Katagas, Arnon Milchan, Yariv Milchan, Michael Schaefer, Carla Ching, Christian Sprenger, Fam Udeorji, and Kaitlin Waldron | Nominated | |
| 2024 | Primetime Emmy Awards | Outstanding Lead Actor in a Drama Series | Donald Glover (for "Couples Therapy (Naked & Afraid)") | Nominated | |
| 2024 | Primetime Emmy Awards | Outstanding Lead Actress in a Drama Series | Maya Erskine (for "A Breakup") | Nominated | |
| 2024 | Primetime Emmy Awards | Outstanding Directing for a Drama Series | Hiro Murai (for "First Date") | Nominated | |
| 2024 | Primetime Emmy Awards | Outstanding Writing for a Drama Series | Francesca Sloane and Donald Glover (for "First Date") | Nominated | |
| 2024 | Primetime Creative Arts Emmy Awards | Outstanding Guest Actor in a Drama Series | Paul Dano (for "A Breakup") | Nominated | |
| 2024 | Primetime Creative Arts Emmy Awards | Outstanding Guest Actor in a Drama Series | John Turturro (for "Second Date") | Nominated | |
| 2024 | Primetime Creative Arts Emmy Awards | Outstanding Guest Actress in a Drama Series | Michaela Coel (for "Infidelity") | Won | |
| 2024 | Primetime Creative Arts Emmy Awards | Outstanding Guest Actress in a Drama Series | Sarah Paulson (for "Couples Therapy (Naked & Afraid)") | Nominated | |
| 2024 | Primetime Creative Arts Emmy Awards | Outstanding Guest Actress in a Drama Series | Parker Posey (for "Double Date") | Nominated | |
| 2024 | Primetime Creative Arts Emmy Awards | Outstanding Casting for a Drama Series | Carmen Cuba, Candice Alustiza-Lee, Teresa Razzauti, and Alejandro Reza | Nominated | |
| 2024 | Primetime Creative Arts Emmy Awards | Outstanding Music Composition for a Series | David Fleming (for "First Date") | Nominated | |
| 2024 | Primetime Creative Arts Emmy Awards | Outstanding Music Supervision | Jen Malone (for "A Breakup") | Nominated | |
| 2024 | Primetime Creative Arts Emmy Awards | Outstanding Picture Editing for a Drama Series | Kyle Reiter and Isaac Hagy (for "First Date") | Nominated | |
| 2024 | Primetime Creative Arts Emmy Awards | Outstanding Stunt Coordination for a Drama Series | Stephen Pope | Won | |
| 2024 | Primetime Creative Arts Emmy Awards | Outstanding Stunt Performance | Tara Macken (for "A Breakup") | Nominated | |
| 2024 | Set Decorators Society of America Awards | Best Achievement in Décor/Design of a One Hour Contemporary Series | Andrew Baseman, Michael Nallan, Gerald Sullivan | Won | |
| 2025 | American Cinema Editors Awards | Best Edited Drama Series | Kyle Reiter and Isaac Hagy (for "First Date") | Nominated | |
| 2025 | Artios Awards | Outstanding Achievement in Casting – Television Pilot and First Season Drama | Carmen Cuba, Charley Medigovich | Nominated | |
| 2025 | Golden Globe Awards | Best Television Series – Drama | Mr. & Mrs. Smith | Nominated | |
| 2025 | Golden Globe Awards | Best Actor – Television Series Drama | Donald Glover | Nominated | |
| 2025 | Golden Globe Awards | Best Actress – Television Series Drama | Maya Erskine | Nominated | |
| 2025 | Saturn Awards | Best Adventure Television Series | Mr. & Mrs. Smith | Nominated | |
| 2025 | Satellite Awards | Best Genre Series | Mr. & Mrs. Smith | Nominated | |
| 2025 | Satellite Awards | Best Actor in a Drama or Genre Series | Donald Glover | Nominated | |
| 2025 | Satellite Awards | Best Actress in a Drama or Genre Series | Maya Erskine | Nominated | |
| 2025 | Society of Composers & Lyricists Awards | Outstanding Original Score for a Television Production | David Fleming | Nominated | |
