= Hampton Playhouse =

Coordinates: 42°55′48″N 70°49′01″W

Hampton Playhouse was a summer theater company in Hampton, New Hampshire, United States. It was founded in 1948 by John Vari and Alfred Christie, who was a teacher at Richmond Hill High School in Queens, New York. Christie's mother, Sarah Christie, ran the concession stand. During the 1950s until the summer of 1980, the home of Maddy Meredith at 38 Mill Road was where most cast and crew members of the company lived for the summer. This ended in 1981, upon the death of Maddy Meredith, at which point the company made alternate arrangements for housing.

Notable actors who spent time at Hampton Playhouse include character actors Carleton Carpenter and Kevin Tighe, as well as Elizabeth Hubbard, Rue McClanahan, JoBeth Williams, Katherine Helmond, and Steve Witting .

Hampton Playhouse eventually closed its doors for good in 2001.
