= Steve Witting =

American actor and director

- Born: United States
- Occupation: Actor
- Years active: 1984–present

Steve Witting is an American actor. He began his career in the 1980s comedy series Valerie (1987) as David Hogan's (Jason Bateman) nerdy friend Bert.

== Early life ==
Witting began acting by joining Richmond Hill High School drama club in Queens, where he was encouraged by Alfred Christie, a teacher who ran Hampton Playhouse in Hampton Beach, New Hampshire. In 1977, Witting, who was 17 at the time, moved to New Hampshire to work at the Hampton Playhouse as an apprentice.

== Career ==
Witting has appeared in several other TV series and films, including Batman Returns (1992), Hoffa (1992) and Shutter Island (2010). He made his directorial debut in 1991 when he directed an episode of Step by Step (1991). Witting also played the main role in a full motion video game for the Sega Mega CD called Wirehead. He played a role in The Wolf of Wall Street.

Many summers throughout his career Witting returned to the Hampton Playhouse as either an actor or director until the Playhouse was demolished in 2001.

== Personal life ==
Witting met his wife, Renee Rogers, while she was an apprentice at the Hampton Playhouse.

== Filmography ==
=== Film ===
Year	Title	Role	Notes
1984	The Flamingo Kid	Frank	
1992	Batman Returns	Josh	
1992	Hoffa	Eliot Cookson	
1993	Dave	Secret Service #1	
1993	Stone Soup	Frank	
2002	Catch Me If You Can	Manager	
2009	The Men Who Stare at Goats	PSIC Worker #1	
2010	Shutter Island	Doctor	
2012	Men in Black 3	MIB Agent	Uncredited
2013	Identity Thief	Bus Station Attendant Carl	
2013	Bad Words	Proctor at Spelling Bee	
2013	Gods Behaving Badly	Carl	
2013	The Wolf of Wall Street	SEC Attorney #2	
2014	The Longest Week	Museum Host	
2015	The Family Fang	Art Critic Jacob Deforest	
2017	The Post	NY Times Staffer	
2018	Game Night	Clown	
2019	The Irishman	Judge William Miller	
2023	Killers of the Flower Moon	Dr. James Shoun	
2023	Fish Out of Water	Robert	Short

=== Television ===
Year	Title	Role	Notes
1986	Perfect Strangers	Delivery Man	Episode: "Check This"
1987–1991	The Hogan Family	Burt	52 episodes
1991	Babes	Leon Greenhulch	Episode: "The Last Temptation of Marlene"
1991, 1993	Matlock	Young Ben Matlock	2 episodes
1994	Hangin' with Mr. Cooper	Leo	Episode: "Clothes Make the Man"
1995	Family Matters	Martin	2 episodes
1995	Maybe This Time	Douglas	Episode: "Out, Out, Damn Radio Spot!"
1997	Chicago Sons	Eddy	Episode: "Pilot"
1999	It's Like, You Know...	Jace	Episode: "Memories of Me"
1999	3rd Rock from the Sun	Ted	Episode: "The Fifth Solomon"
2000	G vs E	Special Agent Carlton Grissom	Episode: "M Is for Morlock"
2000	Murder, She Wrote: A Story to Die For	Speaker / Member of Press	Television film
2001	The Hughleys	Director	Episode: "Whatchoo Stalkin' About, Willis?"
2002	CSI: Crime Scene Investigation	Peter Walker	Episode: "Identity Crisis"
2002	Malcolm in the Middle	Announcer	2 episodes
2004	Joan of Arcadia	Band Teacher	Episode: "No Bad Guy"
2006	Night Stalker	Mr. Corey	Episode: "Into Night"
2008	30 Rock	Rob	Episode: "Reunion"
2009	Law & Order: Criminal Intent	George	Episode: "Folie a Deux"
2010	Boardwalk Empire	Funeral Director	Episode: "Boardwalk Empire"
2011	CollegeHumor Originals	No Beard Santa	Episode: "The Twelve Beards of Christmas"
2013	Good Luck Charlie	Doug Dooley	Episode: "The Unusual Suspects"
2014	Neckpee Island	Jack O'Bannon	Television film
2015	Adam Ruins Everything	Texas Democrat	Episode: "Adam Ruins Voting"
2016	It's Always Sunny in Philadelphia	Wally	Episode: "Mac & Dennis Move to the Suburbs"
2017	Ozark	Bank Manager	Episode: "Sugarwood"
2018	Arrested Development	Derek	Episode: "An Old Start"
2018	Ray Donovan	John Crane	Episode: "He Be Tight. He Be Mean."
2020	The Outsider	Herbert Zucker	4 episodes
2020	Bull	Priest	Episode: "The Ex-Factor"
2022–present	Tulsa King	Donnie Shore	Recurring Role
2025	Black Rabbit	Andy	2 episodes
