= Fish Out of Water (2023 film) =

- Directed by: Francesca Scorsese
- Written by: Francesca Scorsese; Savannah Braswell; Megan Lulu Taylor
- Produced by: Maya Moravec; Izzie Nadah; Federica Domeneghetti; Catrin Ody
- Starring: Jade Pettyjohn; Stephanie Kurtzuba; Legend Lolli; Steve Witting
- Cinematography: Idil Eryurekli
- Edited by: Case Avron
- Music by: Kimberly Hou
- Production companies: One & Other Productions; Sikelia Productions
- Release date: 12 June 2023 (Tribeca Film Festival)
- Running time: 25 minutes
- Country: United States of America
- Language: English

Fish Out of Water is a 2023 short drama film directed by Francesca Scorsese. It follows Lexi, a struggling young mom played by Jade Pettyjohn, who has an opportunity to reconnect with her estranged family after she's approached by her now-sober father with news of her mother's failing health.

== Cast ==
- Jade Pettyjohn as Lexi
- Stephanie Kurtzuba as Brenda
- Steve Witting as Robert
- Sebastio Pigazzi as Keith
- Welker White as Anna
- Alana Barrett-Adkins as Chandra
- Legend Lolli as Tyler

== Production ==
=== Development ===
The project had an all-female core creative team.

=== Screenplay ===
Francesca Scorsese originated the story and then wrote the screenplay with co-writers Savannah Braswell and Megan Lulu Taylor. The script was originally written for a thesis production course at NYU's Tisch School of the Arts.

In a 2023 interview with journalist Scott Feinberg for The Hollywood Reporter, Scorsese explained that she had workshopped the screenplay for "about a year" prior to finalizing it. "The main thing I wanted to express," she explained, "was family: the complications of different family relationships; care-taking for loved ones; and family illness, which is also a big part of my life." She explained that the father in the story is in no way related to her own father, filmmaker Martin Scorsese, but that aspects of the maternal relationship in the film is definitely influenced by her life and her relationship to her mother, Helen Morris, who has Parkinson's, a progressive degenerative disease.

=== Photography ===
Production took place on location in Tuckahoe, N.Y. and in Manhattan in 2023.

Scorsese described the process of making the film as cathartic. On her approach to directing the film, Scorsese explained "Planning is important, but impulse is where the magic is... where I could, I sought some light comedy through unscripted moments. But these were happy accidents, and those because the scenes I really loved."

=== Post-production ===
Scorsese revealed to The Hollywood Reporter that the initial cut of the film was forty minutes long, before eventually being cut down to twenty-five. She explained that her father was helpful and she would go to him for advice through the editing process.

=== Soundtrack ===
The score for the film was composed by Kimberly Hou.

== Reception ==
Fish Out of Water made its premiere at the 2023 Cannes Short Film Corner market in Cannes, France, which takes place annually in conjunction with the Cannes Film Festival. It had its official world premiere at the Tribeca Film Festival on June 11, 2023.

At the time of the premiere, Scorsese was twenty-three years old. Her father, director Martin Scorsese, joined her at the film's Tribeca debut. The film's screening at the Cannes Short Film Corner coincided with the world premiere of Mr. Scorsese's film Killers of the Flower Moon at Cannes in May 2023.

Critic Dallas King drew parallels to Sean Baker's The Florida Project. He praised Scorsese's direction for drawing a strong performance out of her lead, Jade Pettyjohn. He also complimented the work of Scorsese, Braswell, and Taylor on the film's screenplay. After the premiere of the film at Tribeca, Iranian film director Navid Nikkhah Azad wrote that "Fish Out of Water transcends the confines of a short film, offering a profound and thought-provoking experience for viewers. The film's exploration of... the notion that we are all interconnected and inseparable, adds a layer of philosophical depth." He called the film "compelling and resonant."

In a 2023 interview with Deadline, director Francesca Scorsese explained that due to the depiction of the mother character's illness, she was extremely nervous to show the film to her own mother. "It was absolutely terrifying to show it to my mom of all people," she said.
