= Francesca Scorsese =

American filmmaker and actress (born 1999)

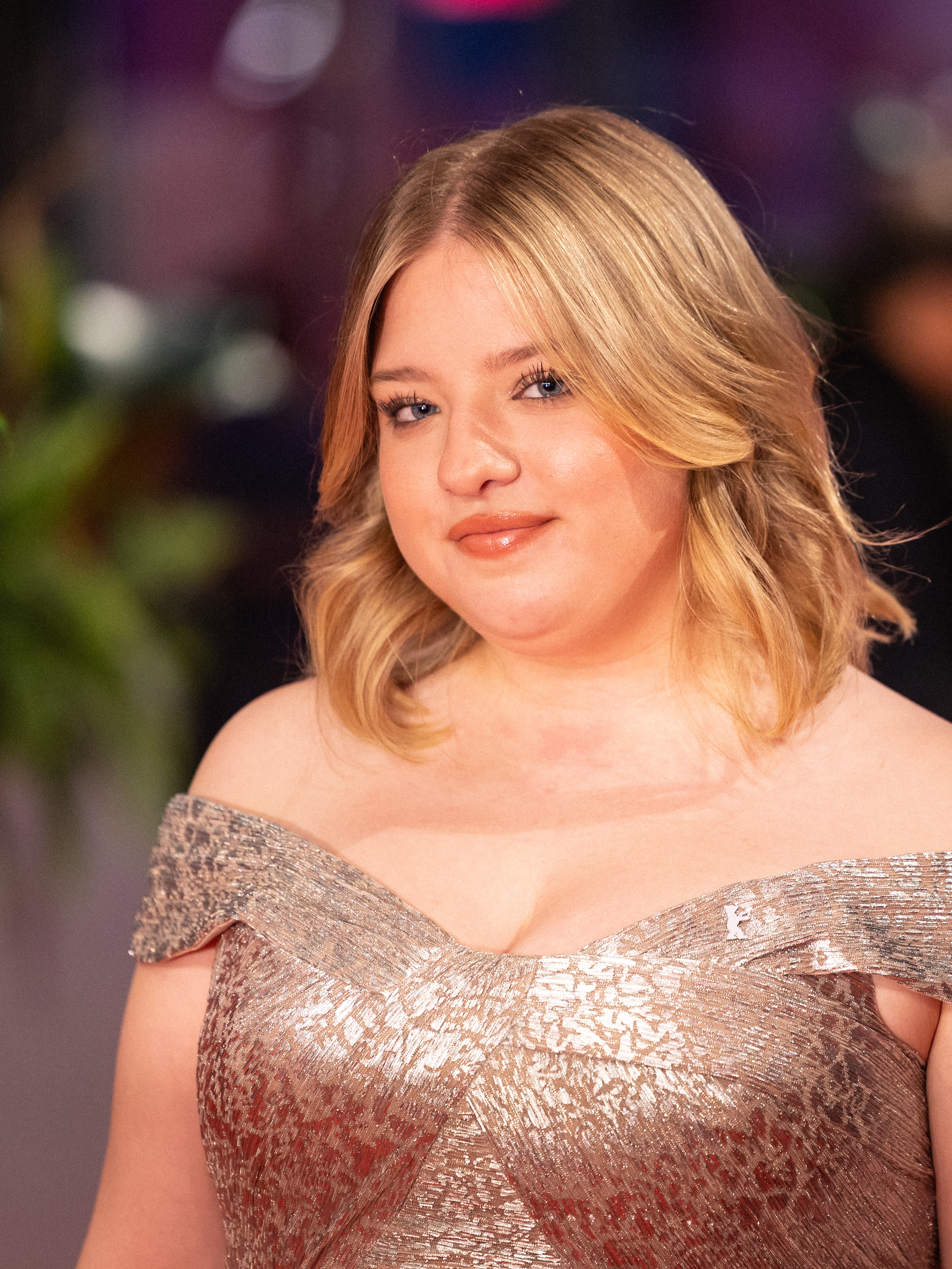
- Scorsese in 2024
- Born: November 16, 1999 (age 26)
- Education: New York University Tisch School of the Arts (BFA)
- Occupations: Actress; film director
- Years active: 2004–present
- Parents: Martin Scorsese (father); Helen Schermerhorn Morris (mother)
- Relatives: Catherine Scorsese (grandmother); Charles Scorsese (grandfather); Domenica Cameron-Scorsese (half-sister)

Francesca Scorsese (born November 16, 1999) is an American actress, filmmaker, and TikTok creator known for co-starring in the HBO series We Are Who We Are and for making social media videos with her father, filmmaker Martin Scorsese.

== Early life and education ==
Scorsese was born on November 16, 1999. She is the daughter of filmmaker Martin Scorsese and book editor Helen Schermerhorn Morris. She has two older half-sisters, Catherine and Domenica. Her father is Italian American and her mother is French American.

Scorsese shot her first footage when she was three years old and continued making home videos with her father. She appeared briefly in some of her father's films, including The Aviator, The Departed, and Hugo. She grew up surrounded by Hollywood stars. She had play dates with Cate Blanchett's children. Robert De Niro is her godfather and when she was growing up, she called Leonardo DiCaprio "Uncle Leo". She told Nylon magazine that "my dad was editing The Wolf of Wall Street while I was doing homework on the staircase and all I could hear was sex scenes."

As an adolescent, Scorsese watched films with her family every weekend. She attended film-related summer programs at the Atlantic Theater Company Acting School and the New York Film Academy. In 2018, she enrolled at the New York University Tisch School of the Arts, graduating in 2023 with a Bachelor of Fine Arts.

== Career ==
Scorsese began posting videos of her father in 2015 on the defunct lip-syncing app Dubsmash. She chose an audio track called "Disco Disco Party Party", which, she later told GQ, her father "thought was the funniest thing ever." She made her father join Instagram as well as the movie rating app Letterboxd.

In 2019, Scorsese was cast as high school student Britney Orton in the HBO series We Are Who We Are, which premiered on September 14, 2020. When director Luca Guadagnino cast her without knowing her last name, she said that "it was one of the first times I was proud of myself."

In December 2019, after Martin Scorsese said in an interview that he did not consider Marvel films to be cinema and wrote an op-ed in The New York Times clarifying his position, Francesca attracted media attention by humorously posting a photo on Instagram of her father's Christmas presents, which she had wrapped in Marvel-themed paper.

Scorsese's short film Fish Out of Water, which she created as a thesis, premiered at the 2023 Cannes Film Festival Short Film Corner. It was also shown at the Tribeca Festival. The film depicts a young mother who learns that her own mother is dying and has the chance to reconnect with her family. The film was partially inspired by Francesca's experience with her own mother, Helen Morris, who was diagnosed with Parkinson's disease in 1990.

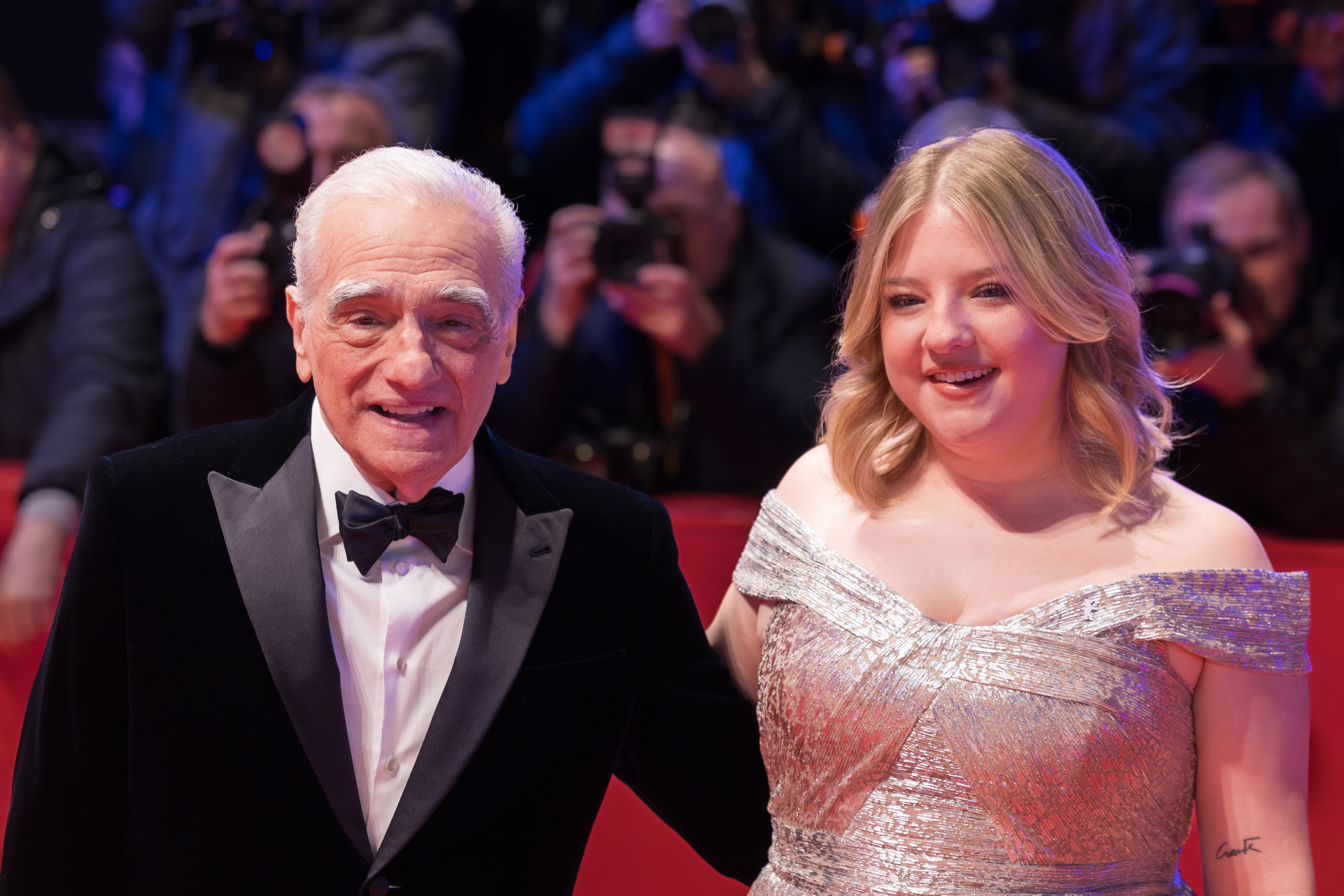
Scorsese with her father at the Berlinale 2024

In July 2023, Scorsese gained popularity on TikTok after posting a 22-second video of her father with the caption "He's a certified silly goose." In October 2023, she posted a TikTok video called "Dad Guesses Slang" in which she explained Generation Z slang such as "simp", "tea," "the ick" and "sneaky link" to him. In the fall of 2023, Scorsese worked with her father to promote his film Killers of the Flower Moon, working within the constraints put on promoting works amid the Hollywood labor disputes.

Scorsese and her father are writing a book for A24 about themselves. They are also working on a long-form project that they say is "top secret". The two of them worked together on a commercial for web hosting platform Squarespace which was aired during Super Bowl LVIII on February 11, 2024, as well as on a commercial for Bleu de Chanel starring Timothée Chalamet, which was released on May 17, 2024.

== Personal life ==
Scorsese lives in Manhattan a few blocks away from her parents' apartment. She is an admirer of Alfred Hitchcock's films and says that she has seen The Birds hundreds of times. Scorsese has said that she enjoys working with her father and that she is trying "to be the best nepo baby that I can be."

== Filmography ==
=== Film ===
Year	Film	Role	Notes	Ref
2004	The Aviator	Little Girl		
2006	The Departed	Little Girl at Airport		
2011	Hugo	Little Girl at Café		
2013	One Direction: This Is Us	Herself	Documentary; uncredited, with father Martin Scorsese	
2016	Almost Paris	Lindsay		
2017	Wolf at the Door	Libby		
2018	We Salute You	Kate	Short film	
2021	Sleeping Beauty	Role unknown		
2022	Crimson Ties		Short film; director and co-writer with Savannah Braswell	
2023	Fish Out of Water		Short film; director and co-writer with Savannah Braswell and Megan Lulu Taylor	
2023	The Muse		Short film; director	
2024	Christmas Eve in Miller's Point	Michelle		
2026	Roommates	Ellie		

=== Television ===
Year	Series	Role	Notes
2010	Boardwalk Empire	Little Girl on Boardwalk	"Boardwalk Empire" (S1, E1)
2020	We Are Who We Are	Britney Orton	Main role
2026	Cape Fear	Reese	Episode: "Phantom Sensations"
