= Martin Scorsese filmography =

Filmography of American filmmaker Martin Scorsese

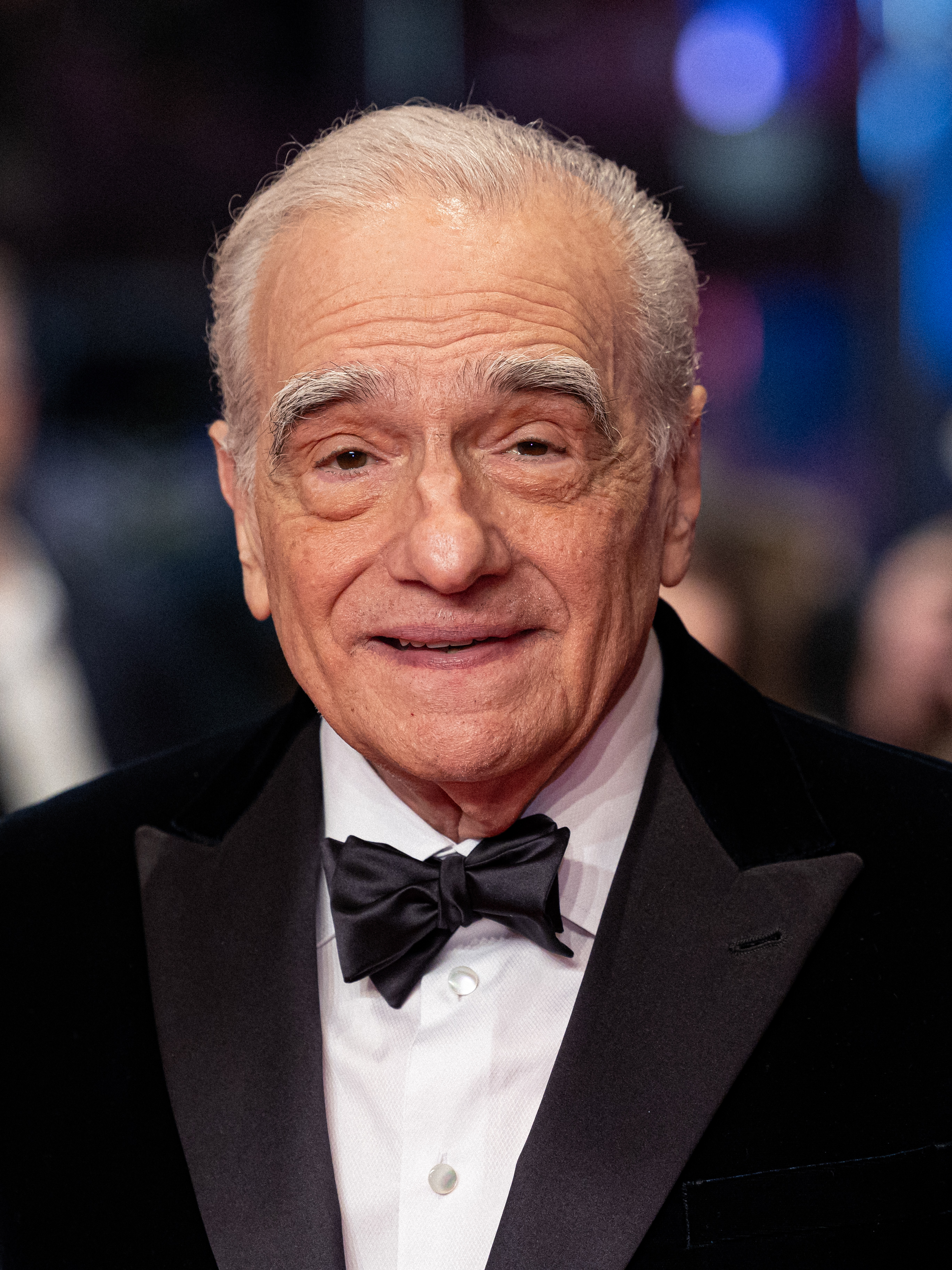
Scorsese at the 2024 Berlin International Film Festival

Martin Scorsese (born 1942) is an American film director, producer, screenwriter, actor, and film historian whose career spans more than fifty years. To date, Scorsese has directed twenty-six feature length narrative films, seventeen feature-length documentary films, and has co-directed one anthology film. His films Mean Streets (1973), Taxi Driver (1976), Raging Bull (1980), and Goodfellas (1990) are often cited among the greatest films ever made and established Scorsese as one of the most respected directors of all time. He became known for his collaborations with actors Robert De Niro and Leonardo DiCaprio.

Scorsese started his career with the independent drama Who's That Knocking at My Door (1967) and the romance drama Boxcar Bertha (1972) before earning acclaim for his crime drama Mean Streets, which was his first collaboration with Robert De Niro. He continued to earn acclaim directing films of various genres such as the romantic comedy-drama Alice Doesn't Live Here Anymore (1974), the psychological drama Taxi Driver, the musical New York, New York (1977), the biographical sports drama Raging Bull, the satirical black comedy The King of Comedy (1982), the black comedy After Hours (1985), the sports drama The Color of Money (1986), and the religious epic The Last Temptation of Christ (1989). After establishing himself as one of the most prominent directors, he gained acclaim throughout the 1990s by directing a string of crime films such as Goodfellas, Cape Fear (1991), and Casino (1995). During this time he also directed period romance The Age of Innocence (1993), and the dramas Kundun (1997) and Bringing Out the Dead (1999).

During the 2000s, Scorsese directed a string of well received epic films such as the historical drama Gangs of New York (2002), the biographical drama The Aviator (2004), and the crime thriller The Departed (2006), the latter of which won the Academy Award for Best Picture and earned him his first Academy Award, for Academy Award for Best Director. Since the 2010s, he has directed the neo-noir Shutter Island (2010), the children's adventure film Hugo (2011), the black comedy crime thriller The Wolf of Wall Street (2013), the religious epic Silence (2016), the gangster epic The Irishman (2019), and the historical anti-western epic Killers of the Flower Moon (2023).

== Feature films ==
Key
†	Denotes films that have not yet been released

Year	Title	Director	Writer	Producer	Notes	Ref.
1967	Who's That Knocking at My Door	Yes	Yes	No		
1969	Obsessions	No	Yes	No	Co-written with Wim Verstappen and Pim de la Parra	
1972	Boxcar Bertha	Yes	No	No		
1973	Mean Streets	Yes	Yes	No	Co-written with Mardik Martin; Inducted into the National Film Registry in 1997	
1974	Alice Doesn't Live Here Anymore	Yes	No	No		
1976	Taxi Driver	Yes	No	No	Inducted into the National Film Registry in 1994	
1977	New York, New York	Yes	No	No		
1980	Raging Bull	Yes	No	No	Inducted into the National Film Registry in 1990	
1982	The King of Comedy	Yes	No	No		
1985	After Hours	Yes	No	No		
1986	The Color of Money	Yes	No	No		
1988	The Last Temptation of Christ	Yes	No	No		
1990	Goodfellas	Yes	Yes	No	Co-written with Nicholas Pileggi; Inducted into the National Film Registry in 2000	
1991	Cape Fear	Yes	No	No		
1993	The Age of Innocence	Yes	Yes	No	Co-written with Jay Cocks	
1995	Casino	Yes	Yes	No	Co-written with Nicholas Pileggi	
1997	Kundun	Yes	No	No		
1999	Bringing Out the Dead	Yes	No	No		
2002	Gangs of New York	Yes	No	No		
2004	The Aviator	Yes	No	No		
2006	The Departed	Yes	No	No		
2010	Shutter Island	Yes	No	Yes		
2011	Hugo	Yes	No	Yes		
2013	The Wolf of Wall Street	Yes	No	Yes		
2016	Silence	Yes	Yes	Yes	Co-written with Jay Cocks	
2019	The Irishman	Yes	No	Yes		
2023	Killers of the Flower Moon	Yes	Yes	Yes	Co-written with Eric Roth	
TBA	What Happens at Night †	Yes	No	Yes	Post-production	

== Documentary films ==
Year	Title	Director	Producer	Writer	Notes	Ref.
1966	New York City... Melting Point	Yes	No	Yes		
1970	Street Scenes 1970	Uncredited	No	No	Also includes him acting	
1974	Italianamerican	Yes	No	No		
1978	The Last Waltz	Yes	No	No	Inducted into the National Film Registry in 2019	
1978	American Boy: A Profile of Steven Prince	Yes	No	No		
1995	A Personal Journey with Martin Scorsese Through American Movies	Yes	Yes	Yes	Co-directed with Michael Henry Wilson	
1999	My Voyage to Italy	Yes	No	Yes		
2003	Feel Like Going Home	Yes	No	No	For the documentary series The Blues	
2004	Lady by the Sea: The Statue of Liberty	Yes	Yes	Yes	Co-directed with Kent Jones	
2005	No Direction Home: Bob Dylan	Yes	Yes	No		
2008	Shine a Light	Yes	No	No		
2010	A Letter to Elia	Yes	Yes	Yes	Co-directed with Kent Jones	
2010	Public Speaking	Yes	Yes	No		
2011	George Harrison: Living in the Material World	Yes	Yes	No		
2014	The 50 Year Argument	Yes	Yes	No	Co-directed with David Tedeschi	
2019	Rolling Thunder Revue: A Bob Dylan Story by Martin Scorsese	Yes	No	No		
2022	Personality Crisis: One Night Only	Yes	No	No	Co-directed with David Tedeschi	
2026	Aldeas, the Final Dream of Pope Francis	Yes	No	No		
TBA	style="background: var(--background-color-warning-subtle, #fdf2d5); color: inherit; vertical-align: middle; text-align: left; " class="partial table-partial"|Shipwrecks of Sicily †	Yes	No	No	Co-directed with Lisa Briggs	
TBA	style="background: var(--background-color-warning-subtle, #fdf2d5); color: inherit; vertical-align: middle; text-align: left; " class="partial table-partial"|Life Is A Carnival: A Musical Celebration †	Yes	No	No		

== Short films ==
Year	Title	Director	Writer	Producer	Notes	Ref.
1959	Vesuvius VI	Yes	No	Yes		
1963	What's a Nice Girl like You Doing in a Place like This?	Yes	Yes	No	Honored at the 1965 National Student Film Festival	
1964	It's Not Just You, Murray!	Yes	Yes	No	Honored at the 1965 National Student Film Festival	
1967	The Big Shave	Yes	Yes	Yes	L'Âge d'or – Knokke-le-Zoute Film Festival	
1989	Life Lessons	Yes	No	No	Segment from the anthology film New York Stories	
1990	Made in Milan	Yes	No	No	Documentary	
2001	The Neighborhood	Yes	No	No	For The Concert for New York City	

== Television ==
Year	Title	Director	Executive producer	Writer	Notes
1986	Amazing Stories	Yes	No	No	Episode: "Mirror, Mirror"
2010–2014	Boardwalk Empire	Yes	Yes	No	Director (pilot "Boardwalk Empire"); Executive producer (56 episodes)
2016	Vinyl	Yes	Yes	Story	Director and story writer ("Pilot"); Executive producer (10 episodes)
2021	Pretend It's a City	Yes	Yes	No	7 episode documentary series
2022	Theodore Roosevelt	No	Yes	No	2 episode documentary miniseries
2022	The Last Movie Stars	No	Yes	No	6 episode documentary series
2024	Martin Scorsese Presents: The Saints	No	Yes	No	8 episode documentary series
2026	Cape Fear	No	Yes	No	10 episodes

== Music videos ==
Year	Title	Artist	Ref.
1987	"Bad"	Michael Jackson	
1987	"Somewhere Down the Crazy River"	Robbie Robertson	

== Commercials ==
Year	Title	Director	Actor	Brand	Notes	Ref.
1968	—N/a	Yes	No	Icelandic Airlines		
1968	—N/a	Yes	No	Revlon		
1986	—N/a	Yes	No	Giorgio Armani / Emporio Armani		
1998	—N/a	No	Yes	U.S. Satellite Broadcasting		
2002	"Scorsese"	No	Yes	Johnnie Walker		
2003	"One Hour Photo"	No	Yes	American Express		
2004	"My Life. My Card."	Yes	No	American Express / Tribeca Film Festival		
2007	"The Members Project"	No	Yes	American Express Member's Project		
2007	The Key to Reserva	Yes	Yes	Freixenet Cava	Long-form commercial	
2008	"Be Sensible"	No	Yes	AT&T	Public service announcement	
2010	"Bleu de Chanel"	Yes	No	Bleu de Chanel		
2012	"NY Taxi"	No	Yes	Apple iPhone 4S		
2013	"Street of Dreams"	Yes	No	The One by Dolce & Gabbana		
2015	The Audition	Yes	Yes	Studio City	Long-form commercial	
2018	"The Art of Storytelling"	No	Yes	Rolex		
2019	"Show Up"	No	Yes	Coca-Cola	Super Bowl commercial	
2023	"Bleu de Chanel"	Yes	No	Bleu de Chanel	Featuring Timothée Chalamet	
2024	"Marty & Francesca Make a Website"	Yes	Yes	Squarespace	Super Bowl commercial	
2024	"Hello Down There"	Yes	Yes	Squarespace	Super Bowl commercial	

== Acting performances and documentary appearances ==
Year	Title	Role	Notes	Ref.
1967	Who's That Knocking at My Door	Thug #2	Uncredited cameo	
1970	Street Scenes 1970	Himself / Interviewer		
1972	Boxcar Bertha	Brothel Customer	Uncredited cameo	
1973	Martin Scorsese: Back on the Block	Himself		
1973	Mean Streets	Jimmy Shorts / Charlie Cappa's Narration	Uncredited cameo	
1974	Alice Doesn't Live Here Anymore	Man in Cafeteria	Uncredited cameo	
1974	Italianamerican	Himself	Uncredited	
1976	Cannonball	Mafioso #1	Uncredited	
1976	Taxi Driver	Passenger Watching Silhouette		
1978	The Last Waltz	Himself / Interviewer		
1980	Raging Bull	Barbizon Stagehand (voice)		
1980	In the Pope's Eye	TV Director		
1983	The King of Comedy	TV Director / Man in Green Van	Cameo	
1983	Anna Pavlova	Giulio Gatti-Casazza		
1985	After Hours	Man with Searchlight	Uncredited cameo	
1986	The Color of Money	Opening Narrator / Man Playing Pool / Man Walking Dog	Uncredited cameo	
1986	Round Midnight	R. W. Goodley		
1988	The Last Temptation of Christ	Isaiah	Uncredited	
1989	New York Stories	Man Having Picture Taken with Lionel Dobie	Uncredited cameo	
1990	Dreams	Vincent van Gogh		
1990	The Grifters	Opening Voice-Over	Uncredited	
1991	Guilty by Suspicion	Joe Lesser		
1993	The Age of Innocence	Photographer	Uncredited cameo	
1994	Quiz Show	Martin Rittenhome		
1995	Search and Destroy	The Accountant		
1995	A Personal Journey with Martin Scorsese Through American Movies	Himself	Host	
1998	With Friends Like These...	Himself		
1998	In Search of Kundun with Martin Scorsese	Himself		
1999	The Muse	Himself		
1999	Bringing Out the Dead	Dispatcher (voice)		
1999	My Voyage to Italy	Himself	Host	
2002	Gangs of New York	Wealthy Homeowner	Uncredited cameo	
2002	Curb Your Enthusiasm	Himself	2 episodes	
2003	Charlie: The Life and Art of Charles Chaplin	Himself		
2004	The Aviator	Hell's Angel's Projectionist (voice)	Uncredited	
2004	Shark Tale	Sykes	Voice	
2005	No Direction Home: Bob Dylan	Himself (voice)	Uncredited	
2007	The Key to Reserva	Himself		
2007	Val Lewton: The Man in the Shadows	Himself	Host	
2008	Shine a Light	Male Gigolo	Uncredited	
2009	Entourage	Himself	Episode: "Return to Queens Blvd"	
2009	30 Rock	Himself	Episode: "Audition Day"	
2011	Corman's World: Exploits of a Hollywood Rebel	Himself	Documentary	
2011	Hugo	Cameraman	Uncredited cameo	
2012	Martin Scorsese Eats a Cookie	Himself	Short film	
2012	Bad 25	Himself		
2013	The Wolf of Wall Street	John (voice)	Uncredited	
2013	One Direction: This Is Us	Himself		
2014	Life Itself	Himself		
2015	Campus Code	Doctor		
2016	Silence	European Visitor	Uncredited cameo	
2019	The Irishman	Court Usher (voice)	Uncredited	
2019	The Irishman: In Conversation	Himself	Documentary short	
2021	Pretend It's a City	Himself / Interviewer	7 episodes	
2023	Killers of the Flower Moon	Radio Show Producer		
2024	Martin Scorsese Presents: The Saints	Himself / Narrator	Docudrama series	
2024	Made in England: The Films of Powell and Pressburger	Himself / Narrator		
2024	Beatles '64	Himself		
2025	The Studio	Himself	Episode: "The Promotion"	
2025	In the Hand of Dante	Isaiah		
2025	Mr. Scorsese	Himself		
2026	Outcome	Richie "Red" Rodriguez		
2026	The Mandalorian and Grogu	Hugo (voice)		
2026	Joie de vivre	Himself		

== Other works ==
=== Producer credits ===
As executive producer

- PoV (1990)
- Naked in New York (1993)
- With Closed Eyes (1994)
- Search and Destroy (1995)
- Grace of My Heart (1996)
- Kicked in the Head (1997)
- You Can Count on Me (2000)
- Rain (2001)
- The Soul of a Man (2003)
- The Road to Memphis (2003)
- Lightning in a Bottle (2004)
- Brides (2004)
- Frankenstein (2004)
- Something to Believe In (2004)
- Val Lewton: The Man in the Shadows (2007)
- Lymelife (2008)
- Surviving Progress (2011)
- Glickman (2013)
- The Family (2013)
- Peter Gabriel: Live in Athens 1987 (2013)
- Life Itself (2014)
- The Third Side of the River (2014)
- Revenge of the Green Dragons (2014)
- The Wannabe (2015)
- Bleed for This (2016)
- Free Fire (2016)
- Before the Flood (2016)
- Tomorrow (2016)
- Abundant Acreage Available (2017)
- Long Strange Trip (2017)
- A Ciambra (2017)
- The Current War (2017)
- The Snowman (2017)
- Diane (2018)
- Happy as Lazzaro (2018)
- Tomorrow (2018)
- The Souvenir (2019)
- Port Authority (2019)
- Once Were Brothers: Robbie Robertson and the Band (2019)
- Uncut Gems (2019)
- Shirley (2020)
- Pieces of a Woman (2020)
- Building a Bridge (2021)
- The Souvenir Part II (2021)
- Murina (2021)
- The Card Counter (2021)
- The Eternal Daughter (2022)
- Pet Shop Days (2023)
- The Freshly Cut Grass (2024)
- Made in England: The Films of Powell and Pressburger (2024)
- Escape (2024)
- Homebound (2025)
- Late Fame (2025)
- In the Hand of Dante (2025)
- The Basics of Philosophy (2026)

As producer

- The Grifters (1990)
- Mad Dog and Glory (1993)
- Clockers (1995)
- Nothing but the Blues (1995) (Uncredited)
- The Hi-Lo Country (1998)
- Picasso & Braque Go to the Movies (2008)
- The Young Victoria (2009)
- Maestro (2023)
- Beatles '64 (2024)
- Die My Love (2025)

=== Other credits ===
Year	Title	Credit
1970	Item 72-D: The Adventures of Spa and Fon	Consulting producer
1970	Street Scenes 1970	Post-production director
1971	We Have Come for Your Daughters	Associate producer

=== Editing ===
Year	Title
1966	New York City... Melting Point
1967	The Big Shave
1970	Woodstock
1971	We Have Come for Your Daughters (Uncredited)
1972	Unholy Rollers (Supervising editor)

=== Commentaries, intros, etc. ===
Title	Credit	Found on
Scorsese Shorts	2020 conversation w/film critic Farran Smith Nehme	Criterion
Who's That Knocking at My Door	Commentary	
Mean Streets	Selected-scene Commentary, conversation	Criterion
Alice Doesn't Live Here Anymore	Commentary w/Ellen Burstyn and Kris Kristofferson	Criterion
Taxi Driver	1991 commentary w/Paul Schrader	Criterion laserdisc
New York, New York	Commentary & intro	
The Last Waltz	Commentary, interviews (Criterion only)	Criterion, Sony Pictures Home Entertainment
Raging Bull	1990 commentary w/Thelma Schoonmaker	Criterion laserdisc
The King of Comedy	Conversation w/De Niro & Lewis	30th anniversary ed
After Hours	Commentary, interview, and featured in bonus documentary	Criterion
The Last Temptation of Christ	Commentary	Criterion
Goodfellas	Commentary	
The Age of Innocence	2018 interview	Criterion
Casino	Commentary	
Gangs of New York	Commentary	
The Aviator	Commentary	
The Departed	Intros to deleted scenes	
Rolling Thunder Revue: A Bob Dylan Story by Martin Scorsese	Interview	Criterion
The Irishman	Conversation w/De Niro, Pacino & Pesci	Criterion
Killers of the Flower Moon	Documentary and press conference featuring Scorsese, etc	Criterion
Martin Scorsese's World Cinema Project	Intros to all 6 films	Criterion
Martin Scorsese's World Cinema Project No. 2	Intros to all 6 films	Criterion
Martin Scorsese's World Cinema Project No. 3	Intros to all 6 films	Criterion
Martin Scorsese's World Cinema Project No. 4	Intros to all 6 films	Criterion
Martin Scorsese's World Cinema Project No. 5	Intros to all 6 films	Criterion
The Thief of Bagdad	Commentary w/Francis Ford Coppola	Criterion
The Life and Death of Colonel Blimp	Commentary w/Michael Powell; intro; restoration demo	Criterion
Gilda	2010 appreciation piece w/Baz Luhrmann	Criterion
A Matter of Life and Death	2008 Interview	Criterion
Black Narcissus	Commentary w/Michael Powell	Criterion
The Red Shoes	Restoration demo; interview	Criterion
The Set-Up	Commentary	Warner Archives
The Tales of Hoffmann	Commentary w/film music historian Bruce Eder	Criterion
The River	2004 interview	Criterion
The Golden Coach	Intro	Criterion
Scandal Sheet	Talking head discussing the life and work of Samuel Fuller	The Samuel Fuller Collection
Pickup on South Street	Written essay	Criterion
La Strada	Intro	Criterion
On the Waterfront	Conversation w/critic Kent Jones	Criterion
Journey to Italy	2013 interview	Criterion
Johnny Guitar	Intro	Olive Films
Drive a Crooked Road	Intro	Film Noir Classics - TCM vault collection
Richard III	Restoration demo	Criterion
Somebody Up There Likes Me	Commentary along with Robert Wise, Robert Loggia, Paul Newman & Richard Schickel	Warner Home Video
The Tall T	Intro	Criterion - The Ranown Westerns: Five Films Directed by Budd Boetticher
Decision at Sundown	Intro	Criterion - The Ranown Westerns: Five Films Directed by Budd Boetticher
The Burglar	Intro	Film Noir Classics - TCM vault collection
Buchanan Rides Alone	Intro	Criterion - The Ranown Westerns: Five Films Directed by Budd Boetticher
Ride Lonesome	Intro	Criterion - The Ranown Westerns: Five Films Directed by Budd Boetticher
Comanche Station	Intro	Criterion - The Ranown Westerns: Five Films Directed by Budd Boetticher
One-Eyed Jacks	Intro	Criterion
Underworld USA	Intro	The Samuel Fuller Collection
Divorce Italian Style	Printed piece	Criterion
Salvatore Giuliano	Written tribute; is also featured in bonus documentary	Criterion
Help!	Booklet written by Richard Lester & MS	Capitol Records DVD
Age of Consent	Intro	2009 DVD release of the Director's Cut
Touki Bouki	Intro	Criterion
Manila in the Claws of Light	Intro	Criterion
Trances	Intro	Criterion
Wiseguy: Life in a Mafia Family	Introduction to the 2019 edition of the book and audiobook	Simon & Schuster
Akira Kurosawa's Dreams	Is featured in bonus documentary	Criterion
Bottle Rocket	Written appreciation	Criterion

=== Additional credits ===
Year	Title	Credit	Notes
1963	Inesita	Photographer	
1970	Woodstock	Assistant director	
1972	Elvis on Tour	Montage supervisor	
1995	Rough Magic	Presenter	
2000	Love's Labour's Lost	Presenter	American release
2005	Brooklyn Lobster	Presenter	
2006	Alpha Dog	Special thanks	Credited as Marty Scorsese
2008	Gomorrah	Presenter	American release
2023	Asteroid City	Special thanks	

== See also ==
- List of awards and nominations received by Martin Scorsese
- Martin Scorsese's unrealized projects
