= Scorsese (surname) =

Scorsese is an Italian American surname (originally Scozzese in Italy, meaning Scotsman or Scottish). Notable people with the surname include:

- Catherine Scorsese (1912–1997), American actress, mother of Martin
- Charles Scorsese (1913–1993), American actor, father of Martin
- Martin Scorsese (born 1942), American film director, writer, and producer
- Domenica Cameron-Scorsese (born 1976), American actress, daughter of Martin
- Francesca Scorsese (born 1999), American actress, daughter of Martin
