= Italianamerican =

1974 film directed by Martin Scorsese

- 2000 VHS cover, coupled with Scorsese's 1967 short film The Big Shave
- Directed by: Martin Scorsese
- Written by: Lawrence D. Cohen; Mardik Martin
- Produced by: Elaine Attias; Bert Lovitt; Saul Rubin
- Starring: Catherine Scorsese; Charles Scorsese; Martin Scorsese (uncredited)
- Cinematography: Alec Hirschfeld
- Edited by: Bert Lovitt
- Release date: 1974
- Running time: 49 mins
- Country: United States
- Language: English

Italianamerican is a 1974 American documentary film directed by Martin Scorsese and featuring his parents Catherine and Charles, who reflect on their experiences as the children of Italian immigrants to New York City.

== Synopsis ==
Over dinner at their New York apartment on Elizabeth Street, Martin engages his parents in a lively and candid discussion about their lives, discussing such topics as their upbringing, family, religion, marriage, their Italian ancestors, post-war life in Italy, and the hardships of poor Sicilian immigrants striving to succeed in America. Catherine also demonstrates her technique for cooking meatballs, a recipe later printed in the end credits of the film.

== Production ==
Martin Scorsese came up with the idea for Italianamerican after returning from his presentation of Mean Streets at the Cannes Film Festival. A script was written by Lawrence D. Cohen in order to receive funding from the National Endowment for the Humanities, but it was not used for the actual film. Six hours of footage was shot, three hours on two days.

Scorsese edited Italianamerican alongside Alice Doesn't Live Here Anymore.

== Reception ==
Italianamerican was received positively after its screening at the 1974 New York Film Festival, with the New York Daily News reporting the film "completely charmed" the "usually blase festival audience."

== Home video ==
On May 26, 2020, the Criterion Collection released Scorsese Shorts, a compilation of five early short films directed by Scorsese: Italianamerican, American Boy: A Profile of Steven Prince, The Big Shave, What's a Nice Girl like You Doing in a Place like This? and It's Not Just You, Murray!

== See also ==
- List of American films of 1974

== Works cited ==
- Wilson, Michael (2011). Scorsese on Scorsese. Cahiers du Cinéma. ISBN 9782866427023.
