= What's a Nice Girl like You Doing in a Place like This? =

1963 film by Martin Scorsese

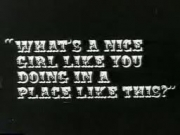
- Intertitle from the film
- Directed by: Martin Scorsese
- Written by: Martin Scorsese
- Cinematography: James Newman
- Edited by: Robert Hunsicker
- Release date: 1963
- Running time: 9 minutes
- Country: United States

What's a Nice Girl like You Doing in a Place like This? is a 1963 American black-and-white short comedy-drama film created by Martin Scorsese while he studied at New York University's Tisch School of the Arts. It is a story about a writer who becomes obsessed with a picture on his wall. The film stars Zeph Michaelis, Mimi Stark, Sarah Braveman, Fred Sica, and Robert Uricola.

The work, shot using 16 mm film, features animations, montage, jump cuts, associative editing, and freeze-frame shots. Scorsese created it shortly after watching Federico Fellini's 1963 surrealist comedy-drama 8½. The negative was cut incorrectly by a student, so a professor asked Thelma Schoonmaker, who was also participating in the summer program, to help Scorsese. Commentators noted that the film has a connection to most of Scorsese's later projects, including Goodfellas (1990) and The Wolf of Wall Street (2013).

The film received positive critical reviews, the majority of which complimented its direction and editing. It was released in 1992 on a VHS compilation tape in the United Kingdom and was re-released in May 2020 in 4K resolution format by The Criterion Collection. It was honored at the 1965 National Student Film Festival with another Scorsese short film It's Not Just You, Murray! (1964).

== Plot ==
A writer, Algernon, moves into a new apartment. He purchases a picture of a boat on a lake from a persuasive salesman although he dislikes it. His friends tell him it is not particularly impressive to look at. After a few days, Algernon finds himself fixating on the image and finds it difficult to write and eat. He believes his obsession with the picture is a result of his intense sensitivity and vivid imagination and he has difficulty sleeping.

Algernon throws a party, where he meets a girl who distracts him from the photograph. He finds her very attractive but does not develop any obsessive feelings about the image around her. Algernon regains the ability to eat, write and sleep. His friends describe the girl as a "real good catch". He later decides to marry her, and they honeymoon at the 1964 New York World's Fair, which is still under construction. After their honeymoon, Algernon starts to write a book of confessions, and the girl paints pictures. However, after having a conversation with a psychoanalyst about his obsession with the image, Algernon becomes focused on another picture, depicting an ocean. His fixation on the new photograph leads him to feel trapped inside it.

== Cast ==
Credits adapted from the British Film Institute.

- Zeph Michaelis as Algernon 'Harry'
- Mimi Stark as a wife
- Sarah Braveman as an analyst
- Fred Sica as a friend
- Robert Uricola as the singer
- Martin Scorsese as a man in the picture

== Themes ==
Director Martin Scorsese said it was inspired by an Algernon Blackwood short story, Mel Brooks's 1963 short animated film The Critic, and French-Italian New Wave cinema. He created and directed the film after watching Federico Fellini's surrealist comedy-drama 8½ (1963) for the first time, which he listed as one of his favorite films. What's a Nice Girl like You Doing in a Place like This? depicts Algernon searching for his identity; which Scorsese would explore in his future works. Themes of Catholic guilt are evident when Algernon begins writing a book of confessions. Author Annette Wernblad noted that Algernon's ego was in "grip of deadly fear" and she compared Algernon to Norman Bates, a fictional character from Psycho created by Robert Bloch.

Ben Nyce describes it as "a light-hearted treatment" of self-destructive behavior. Author Lester Keyser said that Scorsese's "yearning for sex" leads to What's a Nice Girl like You Doing in a Place like This?, Who's That Knocking at My Door and Mean Streets. It was noted by author L. Grist that in certain respects Algernon's "paralysing obsession" with the image was making "himself alienating". He added that, however, his relationship with the man in the picture "renders the photograph, a metaphoric mirror". Grist also pointed out that there is a "technical and logistical circumscription" thus there are repeated use of filming locations, the minimum amount of dress, some scene having no light, "setting-obscuring lighting and montages of stills". When the film is showing Algernon using a typewriter, it was replicated from Shoot the Piano Player. Grist also said that he is aware of the fact man in the picture is Scorsese; in order to become part of the picture, he occupies "a space analogous to that occupied by Scorsese", so he becomes "substitute" of Scorsese. At the end of the film, the analyst tells that "he only half existed to begin with".

== Production ==
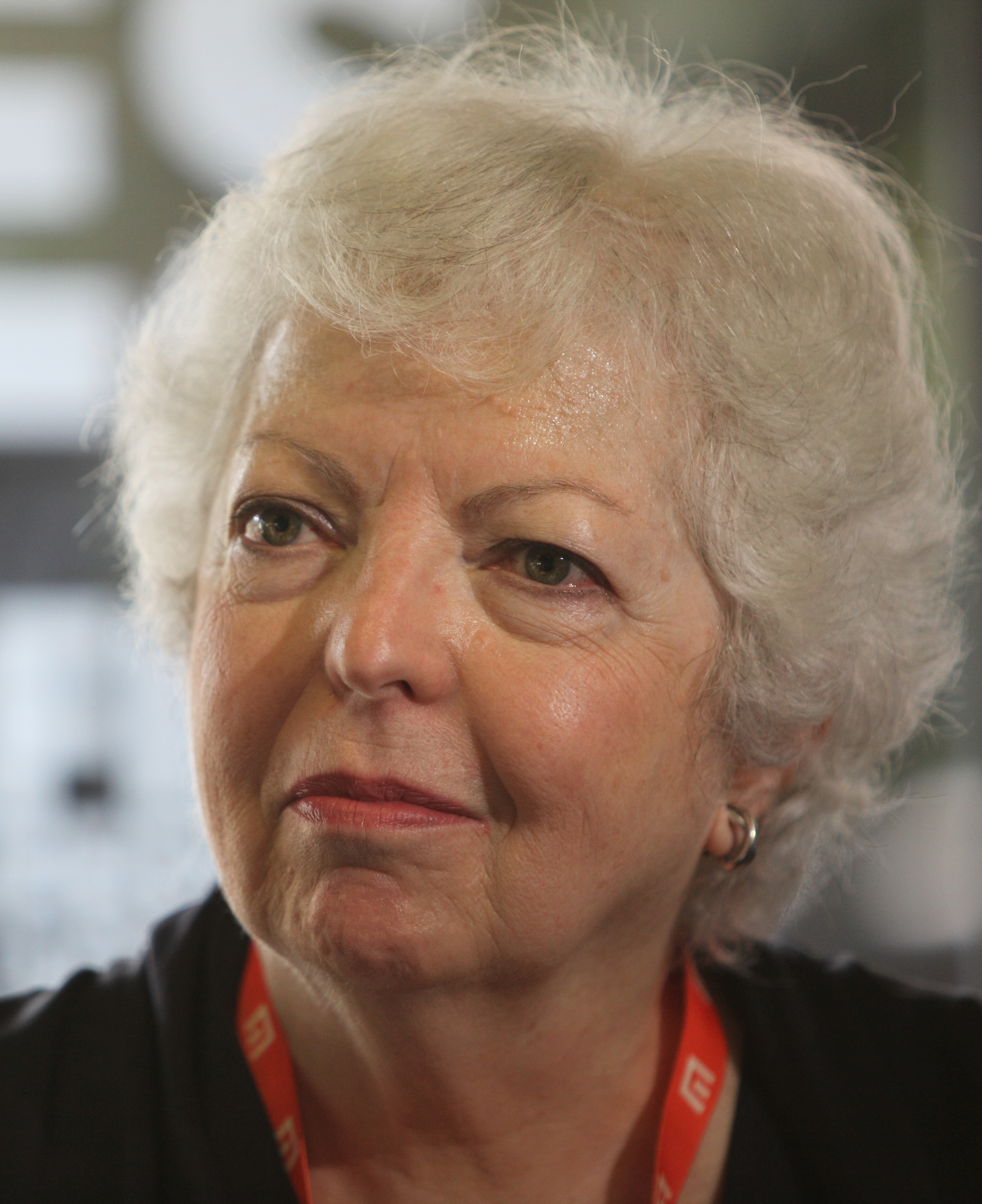
Thelma Schoonmaker helped Scorsese with negative cutting.

Scorsese intended to become a priest, but failed out of seminary. Consequently, he joined the New York University's Washington Square College (now known as the College of Arts and Science). There he met professor Haig P. Manoogian, head of the Department of Television, Motion Pictures and Radio, who he was impressed by his passion and energy. He began to learn the fundamentals of filmmaking.

In 1963, Scorsese wrote and directed his first short film What's a Nice Girl like You Doing in a Place like This? as part of New York University's summer program with the Edward L. Kingsley Foundation, the Screen Producers Guild and the Brown University Film Festival backing the project alongside Manoogian, who produced it. The film features music by Richard H. Coll, cinematography by James Newman, and editing by Robert Hunsicker and contains animation, montage, jump cuts, associative editing, and freeze-frame shots. The professor had motivated Scorsese to write an original script rather than relying on someone else to write the story. Though the film was intended initially to be in the horror genre it evolved into a comedy.

The film's negative was cut incorrectly by a student so a professor asked Thelma Schoonmaker, who was also participating in the summer program, to help Scorsese. Schoonmaker worked with him on his first feature film Who's That Knocking at My Door (1967) and in 1980, she won an Academy Award for Best Film Editing for Raging Bull (1980).

Scorsese says of the work: "My little film had all the tricks and the fun of just putting pictures together in slow motion and fast motion and stills, and intercutting with mattes the way Truffaut would do in Jules and Jim. It had no depth at all, but it was a lot of fun. And I won a scholarship, so my father was able to use it for the tuition for the next year ... [the film is] a tale of pure paranoia." The film is nine minutes long, but the May 2020 re-release lasts ten minutes, two seconds.

== Release, reception and legacy ==
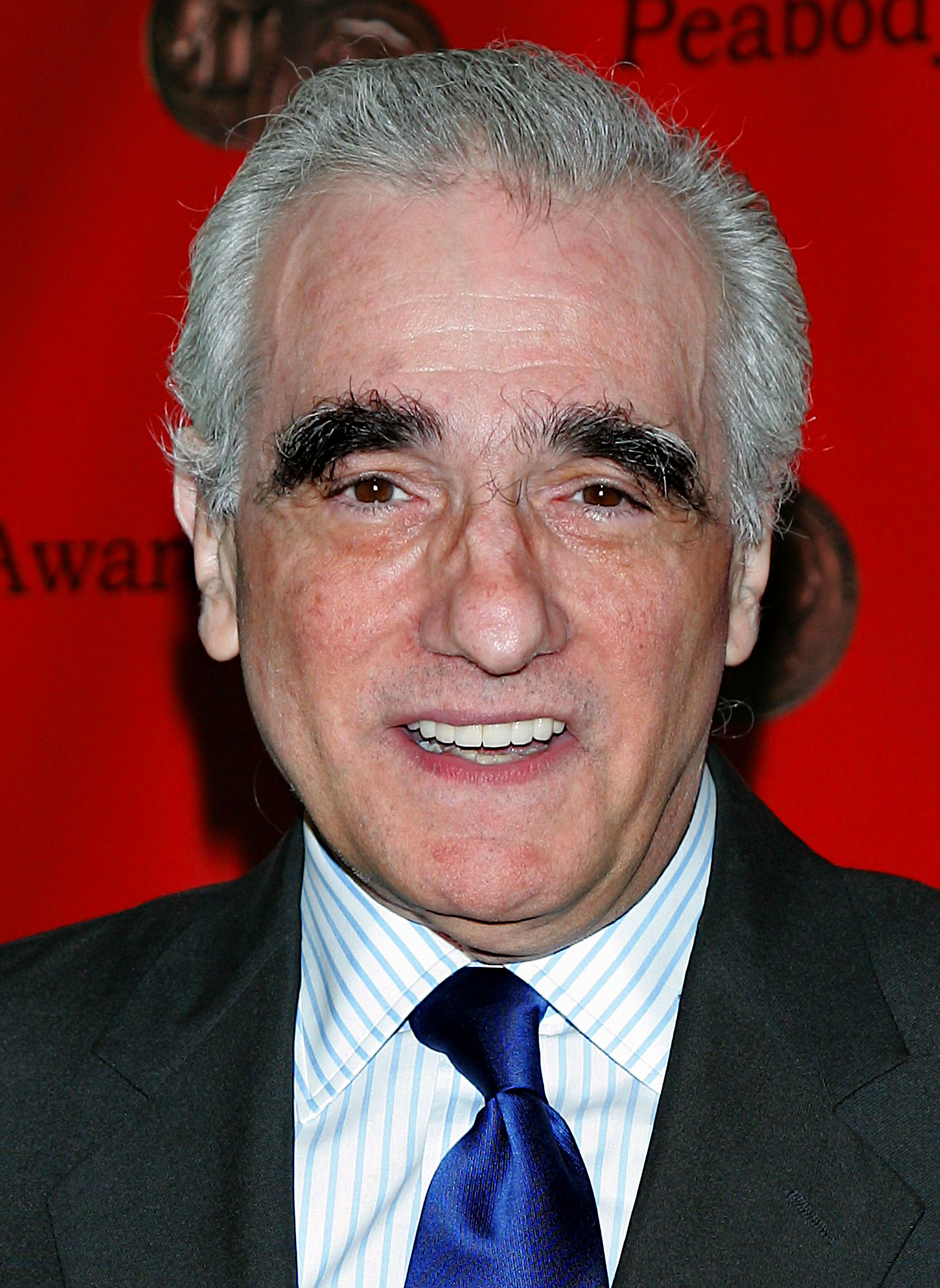
Martin Scorsese, pictured here in 2006, received generally positive feedback for his student film.

What's a Nice Girl like You Doing in a Place like This? was released in 1992 on the Scorsese x4 VHS compilation tape in the United Kingdom. On 26 May 2020, the film was released in a Blu-ray digital format by The Criterion Collection.

Many critics complimented the work of the director, one cited that it was an "early genius" and the staff of the Austin Film Society said that "you can sense the assurance and gifts of its young writer/director". Vincent LoBrutto felt the film's title was a "cliché". Annette Wernblad claimed that "like many of [Scorsese's] other films it is simultaneously absurdly humorous and deeply disturbing". Scott Meslow of Mental Floss suggested that this film was "briskly paced". Peter Galvin writing for the Special Broadcasting Service believed that What's a Nice Girl like You Doing in a Place like This? was one of the inspiration for Goodfellas (1990). Aaron Baker described it as "a hybrid work combining elements of popular entertainment such as Hollywood and vaudeville with a playful, New Wave sensibility".

This work, along with Scorsese's second student project It's Not Just You, Murray! (1964), were honored at the 1965 National Student Film Festival. Jim Sangster said it has a connection to most of Scorsese's later films. Scorsese reexamined a man being trapped inside a picture in the 1990 Japanese-American magical realist Dreams, where he plays Vincent van Gogh who ventures into his painting Wheatfield with Crows. Sangster wrote that when Algernon moves his belongings to a new apartment, it is similar to a scene in David Fincher's 1999 drama Fight Club. Christopher Campbell of Business Insider said the film is Scorsese's "earliest use of a narrator telling his life story in the first person" and compared it to The Wolf of Wall Street (2013). According to Slant Magazine, the painting of an old man in a boat in this film, "amusingly anticipates a painting that would be featured in Goodfellas".
