= Jonathan Taplin =

American film producer

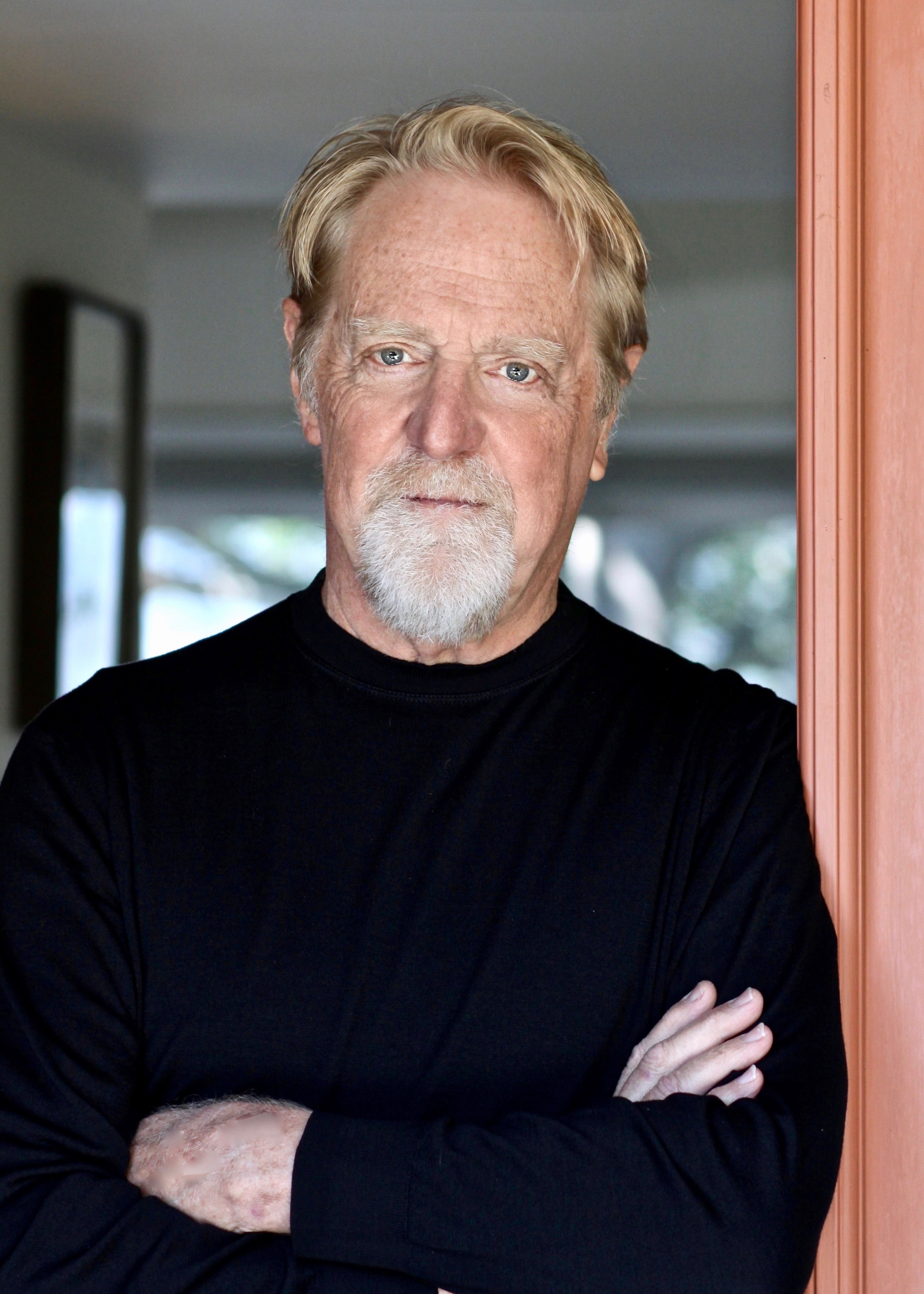
- Born: July 18, 1947 (age 79); Cleveland, Ohio
- Occupations: Scholar, film producer, writer
- Spouse(s): Rosanna DeSoto (1974—1978); Maggie Smith
- Children: 3

Jonathan Trumbull Taplin (born July 18, 1947) is an American writer, film producer and scholar. He was born in Cleveland, Ohio, and has lived in Los Angeles since 1973. Taplin graduated from Princeton University in 1969 and is the Director Emeritus of the Annenberg Innovation Lab at the University of Southern California Annenberg School for Communication and Journalism. Taplin is chairman of the Board of the Americana Music Foundation. He currently writes for Rolling Stone magazine.

Taplin's early production work included producing concerts for Bob Dylan and The Band. In 1973, he produced Martin Scorsese's first major feature film, Mean Streets, which was selected for the Cannes Film Festival. Between 1974 and 1996, Taplin produced 26 hours of television documentaries (including The Prize and Cadillac Desert for the Public Broadcasting Service) and 12 feature films including The Last Waltz, Until the End of the World, Under Fire and To Die For. His films were nominated for Academy Awards and Golden Globe Awards and chosen for the Cannes Film Festival six times.

== Early career ==
Taplin began working as a part-time tour manager on weekends and school breaks for Albert Grossman Management in the summer of 1965. Grossman was a manager of folk and rock musicians in the 1960s, with clients including Bob Dylan, Peter, Paul and Mary, Janis Joplin and The Band. Taplin began work for the Jim Kweskin Jug Band while studying at Princeton University. He managed tours for Judy Collins in 1967 and helped Collins's manager Harold Leventhal produce A Tribute to Woody Guthrie at Carnegie Hall in January 1968; in addition to Collins, Pete Seeger and Arlo Guthrie, the concert featured Bob Dylan and The Band in their first live appearance since 1966.

After graduating from Princeton in May 1969, Taplin moved to Woodstock, New York to serve as The Band's full-time tour manager. In mid-August of that year, The Band played at the Woodstock Festival, and in late August Taplin managed Bob Dylan and The Band's appearance at the Isle of Wight Festival in England, Dylan's first full-length public concert in three years.

== Film production ==
In early 1973, Taplin moved to Los Angeles where he was introduced to a young film editor who had worked on the Woodstock documentary, Martin Scorsese. Scorsese, who had just finished shooting his second feature, Boxcar Bertha, for Roger Corman, showed Taplin his script named Season of the Witch (co-written with Mardik Martin). Changing the title to Mean Streets at the suggestion of their mutual friend Jay Cocks, Taplin later told Peter Biskind that "I was naive enough to think that if I could have produced 150 concerts, I could produce a movie."

Taplin raised US$500,000 independently and Scorsese cast Harvey Keitel and Robert De Niro. Shot in 34 days, the film was eventually sold to Warner Bros. for distribution. The New Yorker's Pauline Kael said it was "a true original, and a triumph of personal filmmaking" and "dizzyingly sensual". In 1997, Mean Streets was selected for preservation in the United States National Film Registry by the Library of Congress as being "culturally, historically, or aesthetically significant".

After Mean Streets Taplin produced or executive produced The Last Waltz, Under Fire, My Science Project, Until the End of the World, To Die For and three long-form documentary series The Prize (Public Broadcasting Service), Native Americans (TBS), and Cadillac Desert (PBS). He was also instrumental in the distribution of Shine when he ran the American division of Pandora (a Paris-based film distributor that controlled the distribution rights to Shine).

In 1996 Taplin founded (along with Richard Baskin and Jeremiah Chechik) one of the first Internet streaming media companies, Intertainer. Intertainer obtained licenses for streaming movies and TV from Warner Bros, MGM, Universal and Sony.

== Teaching and writing ==
In January 2004, Taplin joined the faculty of the University of Southern California Annenberg School for Communication as an adjunct professor. In 2008 he was appointed a full Clinical Professor for the Communications School. His area of specialization is in the field of digital entertainment and International Communication Management. He conducts three seminars a year with communication leaders called The Art of The Long View. He is a member of the Annenberg Research Network for International Communication.

In August 2010, Taplin was appointed Director of the USC Annenberg Innovation Lab. The Lab is funded by the University as well as corporations such as IBM, Intel, Cisco, Verizon, Warner Bros., Orange, DirecTV, EPB, Levi Strauss, and Petrobras. Taplin served on the State of California Broadband Policy Taskforce and the Singapore Government Media Development Authority Advisory Board.

=== Books ===
Taplin is the author of Move Fast and Break Things: How Google, Facebook and Amazon Cornered Culture and Undermined Democracy, which was published in April 2017. Taplin's memoir, The Magic Years: Scenes from a Rock and Roll Life was published by Heyday Books in May 2021. The End of Reality: How 4 Billionaires Are Selling a Fantasy Future of the Metaverse, Mars and Crypto was released in September 2023.

== Personal life ==
Taplin is married to photographer Maggie Smith. He has two children from his previous marriage to Lesley Gilb. He has another daughter from a previous marriage to actress Rosanna DeSoto.
