= Silence (soundtrack) =

Silence (Original Motion Picture Soundtrack)

Film score by Kim Allen Kluge and Kathryn Kluge
- Released: February 17, 2017
- Recorded: 2016–2017
- Genre: Film score
- Length: 51:40
- Labels: Rhino; Warner Classics

Silence (Original Motion Picture Soundtrack) is the soundtrack to the 2016 film Silence directed by Martin Scorsese. The film's original score written and composed by Kim Allen and Kathryn Kluge, consists of minimalistic music mainly produced through ambient natural soundscape. An album consisting the score was released through Rhino Entertainment and Warner Classics on February 17, 2017, nearly a month after the film's theatrical release.

== Development ==
In November 2014, Howard Shore was reported to score music for Silence due to his recurring collaborations with Scorsese. (Note: Shore had collaborated with Scorsese on After Hours (1985), Made in Milan (1990), Gangs of New York (2002), The Aviator (2004), The Departed (2006) and Hugo (2011).) However, he was not involved in the project, and the film was eventually scored by Quad City Symphony Orchestra former music director, Kim Allen Kluge and his wife Kathryn Kluge. During their first meet with Scorsese, the duo recalled that "he wanted to explore a sound world he had never explored before".

The duo eventually read the source material—the novel by Shūsaku Endō, on which the film is based—as the film was in rough cut and felt that "the music should grow as the mist and the rocks and the ocean and the wind and the rain", according to Kathlyn. Reflecting the characters' past, they created a new Shinto music with a series of nocturnes and ambient noises of wind, rain, waves crashing in rocks and the sounds of cicada insect were interwoven with biwa and viola da gamba instrumentation, along with bells, taiko drums and chorus were implemented in the background. The film uses specific period music, including the hymns, chants, orchestral sounds that were juxtaposed with the score which was to link with the spiritual and physical worlds.

== Release ==
Paramount Pictures shared a promotional release of the Kluges' score in their official website on November 30, 2016 as a part of their For Your Consideration campaign for the 2016–17 film awards season. The promotional score featured only 13 cues with a duration of less than twenty minutes. Later, the complete score was distributed by Rhino Entertainment and Warner Classics on February 17, 2017 through iTunes and CD (ASIN release number B01N7S3IB9).

== Critical reception ==
Critics noted at the minimal use of music, which Matt Zoller Seitz of RogerEbert.com attributed it as: "Wood burning, waves crashing, wind moving through grass: this is what you often hear in place of a musical score [...] the soundtrack is filled with moans of pain and screams of agony and the sounds of bones being broken and flame searing flesh." Mark Kermode's review for The Guardian also summarised, "What little music there is remains as distant as the voice of God, drowned out by sotto voce conversations or the distant peal of a chapel bell." Todd McCarthy of The Hollywood Reporter described it as "a subdued, minimalist score". Winston Cook-Wilson of Spin described it as "an unusual and inspired effort".

== Academy Awards disqualification ==
The film's score was ruled ineligible for contention at the Best Original Score category at the 89th Academy Awards. The rules and guidelines for submission in the category at Academy of Motion Picture Arts and Sciences defines that the original score should be a substantial body of music that is written specifically for the film. Only 20 minutes of the film's score was composed for the film, which the organization did not find substantial enough to make it eligible for the award.

== Track listing ==
Silence (Original Motion Picture Soundtrack) track listing
No.	Title	Length
1.	"Meditation"	11:54
2.	"Rain Falls Unceasingly on the Sea"	2:29
3.	"Blowing Through the Grove"	1:48
4.	"Disrupting the Glimmering Air"	1:44
5.	"Cosmic Ocean"	1:36
6.	"Dreams and Echoes"	2:41
7.	"Sea Bells"	1:35
8.	"Rythmic Cidadas"	0:22
9.	"Silence"	0:57
10.	"Whispers in the Dark"	0:33
11.	"Sea Monks"	1:30
12.	"Unravelling"	1:22
13.	"Forgive Me"	2:21
14.	"Darkness"	0:45
15.	"Confession"	2:09
16.	"Ferreira in the Pit"	1:59
17.	"The Dreaded Moment"	0:49
18.	"Drowned Chorus"	1:29
19.	"Cicada Voices in his Head"	1:16
20.	"Secret Sacrament"	2:16
21.	"Sea Angels"	1:20
22.	"Foreboding Sea"	2:25
23.	"Black Drum"	0:57
24.	"Saints and Heroes"	2:17
25.	"Only God Can Answer"	3:06
Total length:		51:40
