= Sikelia Productions =

American film production company

- Formerly: Cappa Productions (1989–2003); Cappa Films (1991–2003)
- Type: Private
- Industry: Entertainment; Motion picture
- Founded: 1989; 37 years ago
- Founder: Martin Scorsese
- Headquarters: New York City, New York
- Key people: Martin Scorsese (CEO)
- Products: Films; Television shows; Documentaries
- Owner: Martin Scorsese
- Number of employees: 10

Sikelia Productions, formerly known as Cappa Productions and Cappa Films, is an American film production company established by Martin Scorsese in 1989. It has produced over 40 different television shows, documentaries, and films. Some of the most notable are Shutter Island (2010), The Wolf of Wall Street (2013), Silence (2016) and The Irishman (2019). The company is based in New York City.

== History ==
In 1989 Martin Scorsese founded his own production company with Cappa Productions. "Cappa" is the maiden name of his mother, Catherine Scorsese, who regularly played roles in his films. In the 1990s, his (ex-) wife Barbara De Fina also worked as a producer for the company. The two also sometimes released films under the label De Fina – Cappa.

In the early 1990s, the company entered into a partnership with Universal Pictures. In 1996, the deal was terminated and, at the behest of Michael Ovitz, Scorsese's former agent, the company began a partnership with Walt Disney Studios.

The name of the company was changed to Sikelia Productions in 2003. "Sikelia" is the Greek name for Sicily, the Italian region where Scorsese's grandparents came from. In the 2010s, the company had a partnership agreement with Paramount Pictures. In 2020, Sikelia entered a first-look deal with Apple.
