= Domenica Cameron-Scorsese =

American actress

- Born: 1976 (age 49–50)
- Education: Wesleyan University
- Occupations: Actress; producer; director
- Years active: 1980–present
- Parents: Martin Scorsese; Julia Cameron
- Relatives: Catherine Scorsese (grandmother); Charles Scorsese (grandfather); Francesca Scorsese (half-sister)

Domenica Cameron-Scorsese (born 1976) is an American actress and filmmaker. Her acting career started with small roles in Cape Fear (1991) and The Age of Innocence (1993), both directed by her father Martin Scorsese.

== Early life and education ==
Domenica Cameron-Scorsese was born in 1976 to Julia Cameron and Martin Scorsese. As a newborn, her mother took her from the hospital straight to the set of New York, New York, which her father was directing. Cameron-Scorsese's parents divorced about a year after she was born, and she lived with her mother for the majority of her childhood. She often visited her father. One of her earliest memories was eating M&Ms in the editing room of Raging Bull, and she appeared in his films Cape Fear (1991) and The Age of Innocence (1993) as a teenager. She also acted in her mother's play, God's Will, in 1989. She appeared in the three-part anthology film New York Stories in the second segment, which was directed by Francis Ford Coppola and written by Coppola and Sofia Coppola. Cameron-Scorsese spent her childhood in different cities including New York, Chicago, Los Angeles, and Taos, New Mexico, where she graduated from high school. She attended Wesleyan University, where she was a member of the Middletown Chapter of the Alpha Delta Phi Literary Society. She took a class on Alfred Hitchcock that deepened her appreciation of film. During a yearlong study abroad program at Trinity College Dublin, she wrote and directed a play about date rape. She graduated in 1998 with a degree in French. She was not one of the filmmakers “who picked up a camera at the age of 5 and decided that this is what I want to do with my life,” she said. One of the people who inspired Cameron-Scorsese's interest in cinema was Jeanine Basinger, head of Wesleyan's film school and cinematic archives.

== Career ==
After graduating from Wesleyan, Cameron-Scorsese moved to Los Angeles to pursue a career in acting even though her father discouraged her from acting, telling her, "Why that? It’s the least power, the most rejection." Her first jobs after graduating were the film Another Happy Tear and the play Four Roses, written by her mother. In 2003, she acted in the play Franny's Way with co-stars including Elisabeth Moss, Penny Fuller, and Susan May Pratt.

In 2017, Cameron-Scorsese's feature-length directorial debut Almost Paris was screened at the 2017 Golden Door International Film Festival. Almost Paris tells of a former Wall Street banker who has to return home after the mortgage lending crisis.

In 2011, she got married in Chicago.

== Filmography ==
| Year | Film | Role |
|---|---|---|
| 1989 | God's Will | Victoria |
| 1991 | Cape Fear | Dani's Friend |
| 1992 | Straight Talk | Girl |
| 1993 | The Age of Innocence | Katie Blenker |
| 2000 | Another Happy Tear | Beverly |
| 2000 | Bullfighter | Laila |
| 2003 | A House on a Hill | Jennifer |
| 2004 | Au Pair Chocolat | Raven |
| 2005 | God's Forgotten House | Alice |
| 2006 | The Still Life | Art buyer |
| 2009 | Absence | Christina |
| 2016 | First String | Evelina Axel |
| 2018 | Atomic Apocalypse (Black Flowers) | Icon |
| 2019 | The Lurker | Mrs. Wilson |
