= Rice Building =

- U.S. Historic district – Contributing property
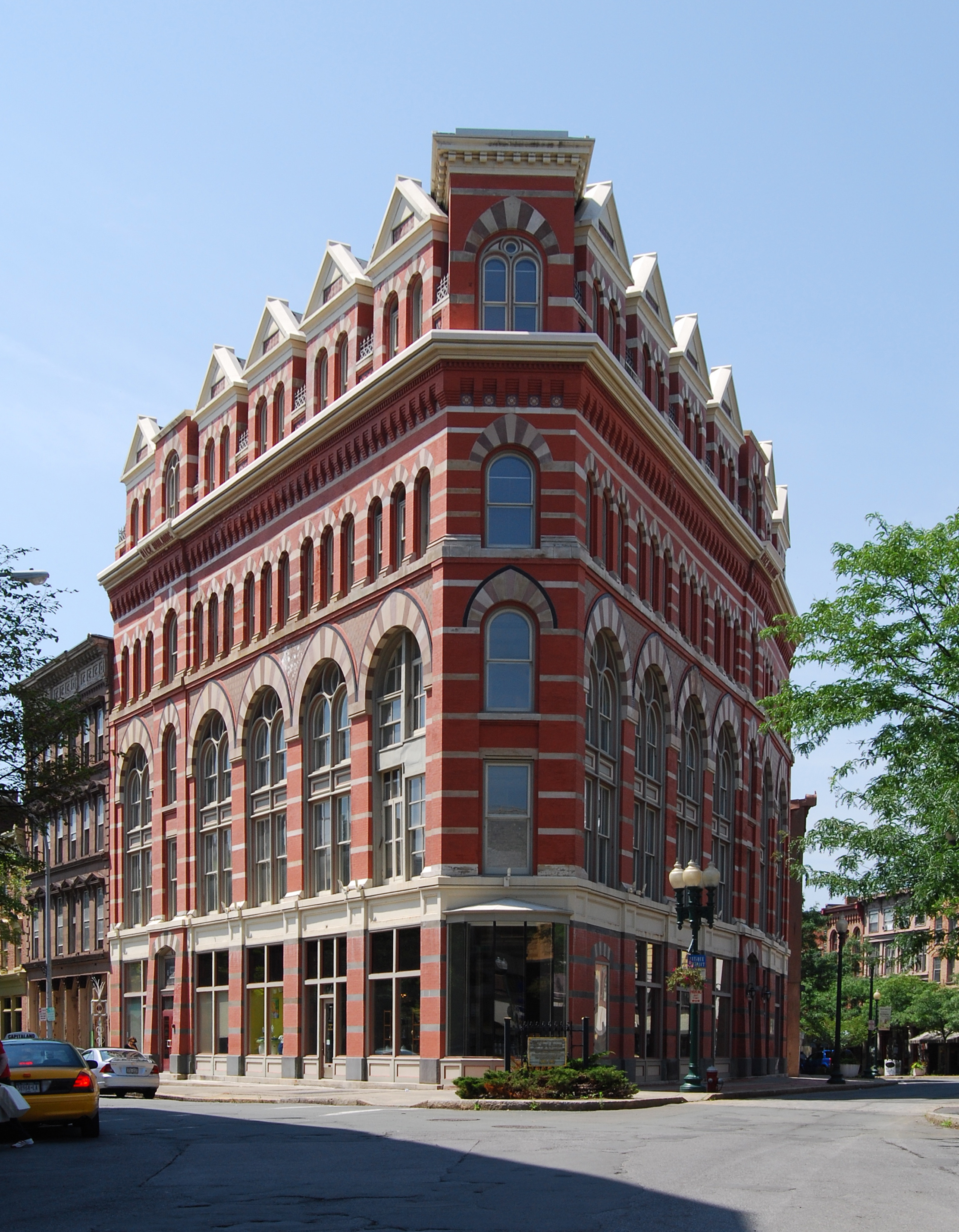

- Location within New York
- Location: 216 River Street, Troy, New York
- Coordinates: 42.731006°N 73.693144°W
- Built: 1871
- Architect: Vaux and Withers
- Architectural style: Victorian Gothic
- Part of: Central Troy Historic District (ID86001527)

The Rice Building, originally known as the Hall Building for Benjamin Homer Hall who built it, is a triangular historic high Victorian Gothic structure with Moorish architecture window arches in Troy, New York. Built in 1871 for attorney, author, and poet Benjamin Homer Hall who served as City Clerk of Troy, it is located at 216 River Street on the corner of First Street. It has been attributed to the firm of Vaux and Withers, the partnership between Calvert Vaux and Frederick Clarke Withers, after the death in a steamboat accident of Andrew Jackson Downing. More recent scholarship by a professor suggests George B. Post was the building's architect. It is part of the Central Troy Historic District.

Originally six stories with three towers on the roof, a fire damaged the top floor, and it was removed along with the towers. In more recent decades, the building fell into disrepair after it went into foreclosure in the 1980s. An effort to save it was launched and it was restored in the 1990s. A nonprofit entity called Rice Building Incorporated was created to turn it into a business incubator center. With support from state senator Joseph Bruno, the State of New York provided $2 million for the project. The architecture firm Lepera & Ward headed the project. Ganem Contracting was also involved in the project and photographed the work and many architectural details. The origin of the name "Rice Building" is not known.

== Benjamin Homer Hall ==
The building was originally known as the Hall Building for attorney and poet Benjamin Homer Hall (November 14, 1830 – April 6,1893) who had it built. Hall was educated at Harvard University and served as City Clerk of Troy. The building may have been an inspiration for New York City's Flatiron Building. Hall wrote A Collection of College Works and Customs (ca. 1850), History of Eastern Vermont, from its Earliest Settlement to the Close of the Eighteenth Century (1858), and Bibliography of the United States (1860). He married Margaret McCoun Lane, the daughter of Jacob L. Lane of Troy.

A collection of his and his father Daniel Hall's papers include correspondence with Amos Eaton, ( geologist and founder of Rensselaer Institute), Edward Everett, William H. Seward, Hamilton Fish, Robert Todd Lincoln, Horatio Seymour, William L. Marcy, John E. Wool, and Asa Fitch.

== Fire ==
The upper floor and roof towers were damaged by a fire in 1913 1916, or 1920 (when a fire struck River Street), depending on the source.

== Other information ==
The building was constructed on the site of Lane's Row and replaced structures on that site. Edgar Holloway made an etching of the building in 1974. The building appears in the Martin Scorsese film, based on Edith Wharton's 1920 novel, "The Age of Innocence (1993 film)" as a law office in New York City. The building was sold in 2016 for $800,000 to Tai Ventures. Rensselaer Polytechnic Institute was involved in saving and restoring the building. The building features pointed-arch polychrome voussoirs. A plan to restore the building to its original aspect with architectural features including the towers was proposed by Joseph Michael Kelly, Architect and Engineer in 2015.
