= Wise Guys (1986 film) =

1986 film directed by Brian De Palma

- Theatrical release poster
- Directed by: Brian De Palma
- Written by: George Gallo; Norman Steinberg
- Produced by: Aaron Russo
- Starring: Danny DeVito; Joe Piscopo; Harvey Keitel; Ray Sharkey; Captain Lou Albano
- Cinematography: Fred Schuler
- Edited by: Gerald B. Greenberg
- Music by: Ira Newborn
- Production company: Metro-Goldwyn-Mayer
- Distributed by: Metro-Goldwyn-Mayer
- Release date: April 18, 1986
- Running time: 100 minutes
- Country: United States
- Language: English
- Budget: $13 million
- Box office: $8.4 million

Wise Guys is a 1986 American black comedy crime film directed by Brian De Palma and produced by Aaron Russo from a screenplay written by George Gallo and Norman Steinberg. It stars Danny DeVito and Joe Piscopo as Harry Valentini and Moe Dickstein, two small-time mobsters from Newark, New Jersey, and features Harvey Keitel, Ray Sharkey, Lou Albano, Dan Hedaya and Frank Vincent.

De Palma later called it "a movie I wish I hadn't done... The studio changed their minds and didn't want to make it. They just wanted us to go away. I should have just taken my money and walked instead of dealing with a studio that didn't want to make the movie."

== Plot ==
Italian American Harry Valentini and his Jewish friend and next-door neighbor Moe Dickstein occupy the bottom rung of Newark Mafia boss Anthony Castelo's gang. Making a living by doing Castelo's lowest jobs, such as looking after his goldfish, testing out bullet-proof jackets, or checking Castelo's car for bombs, the two men dream of opening the world's first Jewish-Italian delicatessen. However, they get little to no respect from their boss or his subordinates, who frequently ridicule them. They accompany Frank "The Fixer" Acavano, one of Castelo's top men and a violent psychopath, to Meadowlands Racetrack to place a bet on Castelo's behalf. Valentini changes horses at the last minute because Castelo usually bets on the wrong one. However, this time Castelo had fixed the race, meaning that Harry and Moe now owe their boss $250,000. After a night of torture, both are forced to agree to kill each other.

Unaware that each has made a deal and frightened following the murder of Harry's cousin, Marco Santucci, they steal Acavano's Cadillac and travel to Atlantic City to see Harry's uncle Mike, a retired mobster who started Castelo in the crime business. After using Acavano's credit cards to pay for a luxury stay in a hotel owned by their old friend Bobby DiLea, the two go to Uncle Mike's house to ask for help. They find only Uncle Mike's ashes, leading to Moe leaving in disgust. Grandma Valentini, however, is able to give Harry the money he owes. Harry tries to get DiLea to sort things out with Castelo. As he and Moe leave the hotel, their limo is being driven by Acavano, after DiLea appears to double-cross the two. Harry luckily spies Castelo's hitmen and decides to stay behind and gamble the money. After a chase through the hotel casino, Moe catches up to Harry and accidentally shoots him. Harry is pronounced dead and Moe flees.

Back in Newark, Moe hides out of sight at Harry's funeral. He is spotted by Acavano and Castelo resolves to kill Moe after the service. Moe returns to his house, full of guilt and remorse for killing Harry, preparing to hang himself. Before doing so, sees a vision of Harry at the foot of the stairs. He quickly realizes that it is actually Harry, who arranged the whole thing with DiLea. Moe is thrilled, although he is so shocked that he is almost hanged anyway until Harry intervenes. Harry provides a skeleton for Moe and they write a suicide note before turning on the gas and setting fire to the curtains. As the two leave Moe's house, however, the door slams shut and puts the fire out. Castelo and his men enter to find a bizarre scene. Castelo takes out a cigarette, prompting his stooges to routinely spark their lighters for him. Acavano asks "Who farted?", prompting Castelo to realize the house is filled with gas just before the house explodes, with the crew inside it. Harry and Moe return to Atlantic City, where Moe bemoans the fact that they didn't keep the money. Harry informs him that he did save the money, but has invested it. Moe seems perturbed, but the film ends with their dream realized as the two stand in their Jewish-Italian delicatessen at DiLea's hotel.

== Cast ==
- Danny DeVito as Harry Valentini
- Joe Piscopo as Morris "Moe" L. Dickstein
- Harvey Keitel as Bobby "D" DiLea
- Ray Sharkey as Marco Santucci
- Dan Hedaya as Anthony "Tony" Castelo
- Lou Albano as Frank "Frankie the Fixer" Acavano
- Julie Bovasso as Lil Dickstein
- Patti LuPone as Wanda Valentini
- Antonia Rey as Aunt Sadie Valentini
- Mimi Cecchini as Grandma Angelina Valentini
- Matthew Kaye as Harry Valentini Jr.
- Tony Munafo as Santo Ravallo
- Tony Rizzoli as Joey "New Shoes" Siclione
- Frank Vincent as Louie Fontucci
- Rick Petrucelli as Al
- Anthony Holland as Karl
- Dan Resin as Maitre D'
- Jill Larson as Mrs. Fixer
- Maria Pitillo as Masseuse
- Catherine Scorsese as Birthday Guest
- Charles Scorsese as Birthday Guest

== Production ==
Writer George Gallo later recalled the film was a "CAA package". He said Brian De Palma "was a CAA client, and that was when CAA was like the Mafia. They would just plug their guys in. Brian said he wanted to do a comedy, Joe was CAA, Danny was CAA, Brian was CAA and so was [producer] Aaron [Russo]. And at the time so was I."

De Palma had directed comedies in the early part of his career but this was his first comedy since 1973. "I think it’s important to try to do more and more challenging and new things," he said. "In order to do that, you have to work a lot and be able to learn from your past experiences, the good as well as the bad ones... This time no one can accuse me of ripping off Hitchcock." After viewing a cut of the film, MGM executives requested De Palma bring in Garry Marshall to help him re cut it. De Palma refused.

Joe Piscopo later said of the film, "I play more of myself, where I should’ve probably played a developed character. That’s what I do best. If I’m not in front of a live crowd ingratiating them where my full strength is … I can play a character, and I should’ve probably done that with Wise Guys."

== Reception ==
The film has a 29% rating on Rotten Tomatoes, based on 17 reviews. Audiences polled by CinemaScore gave the film an average grade of "C−" on an A+ to F scale.

A positive review came from The New York Times, with Walter Goodman calling it amusing and fresh before concluding that "Everything works." Roger Ebert was similarly enthusiastic, giving the film three-and-a-half stars out of four and writing, "Wise Guys is an abundant movie, filled with ideas and gags and great characters. It never runs dry." Gene Siskel of the Chicago Tribune awarded a perfect grade of four stars and raved, "Big laughs, foul language to the point of absurdity and one hilarious, screaming performance atop another combine to make Wise Guys one of the funniest times you will have at the movies this year."

A negative review in Variety stated, "Gone are the flamboyant excesses that made a DePalma film instantly recognizable. What's left is a limp, visually dull look at limp, mentally dull people. Equally guilty is the cast of unfunny comics led by Joe Piscopo and Danny DeVito ... There is little chemistry between the two to suggest their supposed great friendship and more often than not they appear to be acting separately, each in a different film."

Patrick Goldstein of the Los Angeles Times wrote, "Directed by Brian De Palma with an uncharacteristic twinkle in his eye, the film offers such a likeable gallery of cement-heads that we're in no mood to carp about the movie's creaky storyline, belabored gags or meandering chase scenes." Paul Attanasio of The Washington Post remarked, "There is plenty of dumb stuff in Wise Guys, a rambunctious comedy about two screwballs on the loose, probably more than anyone should stand for. But the doughty will stick around for its small pleasures, most of which spring from the lens of Brian De Palma—yes, that Brian De Palma, the sanguinary scourge of women everywhere, who seems to have gotten into this as something of a lark."

== Home media ==
Shortly after the film's release, Ted Turner acquired the rights to all films which MGM had released up until May 1986, with this library and the rest of Turner's assets being merged with Time Warner in 1996. Wise Guys was the second most recent MGM film to be acquired by Turner (and later Warner), behind only Killer Party, which was released in May 1986. After its original VHS release through Turner Entertainment, Wise Guys was released on DVD by Warner Home Video on August 30, 2005, as a Region 1 widescreen DVD and more recently as a DVD-on-demand from Warner Archive Collection available through Amazon.
