= The Lurker =

- Directed by: Eric Liberacki
- Written by: John Lerchen
- Produced by: John Lerchen; Wynona Ying Li
- Starring: Scout Taylor-Compton; Michael Emery; Domenica Cameron-Scorsese; Rikki Lee Travolta; Naomi Grossman; Ari Lehman
- Cinematography: Brandon Hoeg
- Edited by: Ward Crockett
- Music by: Misha Segal
- Production company: Forever Safe Productions
- Distributed by: Indican Pictures
- Release date: September 1, 2019
- Running time: 80 minutes
- Country: United States

The Lurker is a 2019 American horror feature film written by John Lerchen and directed by Eric Liberacki. Described as an ode to 1980s slasher films, The Lurker stars Scout Taylor-Compton, Michael Emery, Domenica Cameron-Scorsese, Rikki Lee Travolta, Naomi Grossman, and Ari Lehman. The film was produced by Forever Safe Productions and is distributed by Indican Pictures.

In tribute to the 1980s slasher films it seeks to emulate, The Lurker is set in Crystal Lake, Illinois - the same location that the original Friday the 13th film took place.

== Plot ==
Taylor is caught sleeping with her teacher Will, who is also dating Taylor's mother, by several other students. They report her to the guidance counselor, who forces her to take an abortion pill. They begin to seek revenge by murdering people one by one, wearing a disguise to ensure that no one realizes that it's them. They also target those who anger them or stand in the way of Taylor attending Juilliard. Meanwhile Taylor pretends that she is also targeted by the killer.

The murders reach a crescendo during a celebration over the drama club's final performance of Romeo and Juliet. Taylor and Will imprison the drama club teacher and murder him for threatening to ruin Taylor's chances at Juilliard, after which Taylor murders Will and frames him for all of the murders. She then passes out.

Taylor wakes in the hospital, where she learns that she is pregnant and has been accepted to Juilliard. She also learns that one of her victims has survived and is also in the hospital. Aware that he could identify her as one of the murderers, Taylor successfully enters his room and murders him. She's discovered covered in blood and catatonic by the hospital staff.

== Cast ==
- Scout Taylor-Compton as Taylor Wilson
- Michael Emery as Miles Little
- Domenica Cameron-Scorsese as Mrs. Wilson.
- Rikki Lee Travolta as Ross Little
- Naomi Grossman as Grace Fisher
- Adam Huss as Ace Hoffman
- Ari Lehman as Doctor Stratton
- Kali Skatchke as Emma Jones
- Charles Johnston as Will Brewer
- Casey Tutton as Tory Nowak
- Isabel Thompson as Hannah Hizer
- Emmaline Skillicorn as Lily Clark
- Bruce Spielbauer as Arthur Scott
- Josh Morris as Billy
- Walter S. Bernard as Vinnie
- Roy Rainey as Matt
- Marissa Banker as Chloe
- Arielle Kresich as Reporter
- Ryan Ohm as Capulet
- Robert Manzano as Stagehand

== Reception ==
In its review, Culture Crypt states that "just because she played young Laurie Strode in Rob Zombie’s “Halloween” doesn’t mean she can squeeze into similar role requirements 10+ years later." In a review for The Tenth Circle, Dante Yurei writes, "The protagonist Scout Taylor-Compton (“Halloween” 2007) does a good job in her performance but is never able to overcome her appearance and make the viewer think that she really is a high school student, something that gathers importance in the plot." In his review for Voices from the Balcony, Jim Morazzini states, "...the film is badly hurt by its casting of Compton in the lead role. She’s way too old for the part and looks it. She’s a good actress but she can’t pass for someone half her age."

Several other elements are called out in reviews as well. The Rotting Zombie calls Travolta a "great scene stealing actor" and "by far the best part of The Lurker." Of Grossman, Cryptic Rock's Jeanie Blue says "she does provide perhaps the best death scene of the film." Cult Faction gives high praise to the film's soundtrack, stating "Being that this film is inspired by the slasher flicks of the 80s, the soundtrack feels decidedly from that era. Lots of synths and pulsing beats make the film feel warmer than a regular soundtrack would and it really enhances the film."

In its review Cryptic Rock states that "Flawed from its infancy, the film offers too few thrills and lacks in truly satisfying blood spills. However, it would be unfair to write this off as one to simply pass over, as its short run-time creates an easily-digested romp." In a review available from HK and Cult Film News, it states "The Lurker sets out to be a bloody 80s-style slasher movie that doesn't kid around, and it does so in entertaining fashion."
