= The Age of Innocence (1993 film) =

1993 film directed by Martin Scorsese

- Theatrical release poster
- Directed by: Martin Scorsese
- Screenplay by: Jay Cocks; Martin Scorsese
- Based on: The Age of Innocence 1920 novel by Edith Wharton
- Produced by: Barbara De Fina
- Starring: Daniel Day-Lewis; Michelle Pfeiffer; Winona Ryder
- Cinematography: Michael Ballhaus
- Edited by: Thelma Schoonmaker
- Music by: Elmer Bernstein
- Production company: Cappa Productions
- Distributed by: Columbia Pictures
- Release date: September 17, 1993
- Running time: 138 minutes
- Country: United States
- Language: English
- Budget: $34 million
- Box office: $68 million

The Age of Innocence is a 1993 American historical romantic drama film directed by Martin Scorsese. The screenplay was adapted from Edith Wharton's 1920 novel by Scorsese and Jay Cocks. The film stars Daniel Day-Lewis, Michelle Pfeiffer, Winona Ryder, and Miriam Margolyes.

The film tells the story of Newland Archer (Day-Lewis), a wealthy New York society attorney who finds himself caught between two women, the conformist May Welland (Ryder) and the unconventional Countess Ellen Olenska (Pfeiffer).

The Age of Innocence was released theatrically on September 17, 1993, by Columbia Pictures. It received critical acclaim, winning the Academy Award for Best Costume Design, and being nominated for Best Actress in a Supporting Role (Ryder), Best Adapted Screenplay, Best Original Score, and Best Art Direction. Margolyes won the Best Supporting Actress BAFTA in 1994. The film grossed $68 million on a $34 million budget. Scorsese dedicated the film to his father, Luciano Charles Scorsese, who died the month before it was released. Luciano and his wife, Catherine Scorsese, have cameo appearances in the film.

== Plot ==
In the 1870s, New York City is dominated by a community of old-money families whose lives are guided by strict codes of conduct. The elite police their own through ostracism or worse.

Gentleman lawyer Newland Archer is planning a society marriage to May Welland. May's cousin, Countess Ellen Olenska, returns to New York City after a disastrous marriage to a Polish count. When he was unfaithful to her, she left him with the assistance of his secretary, Monsieur Riviere, with whom she was rumored to have lived for the following year.

Due to high society's rigid standards, Ellen's conduct is considered particularly scandalous, so she is initially ostracized. Archer is indignant at the unfair treatment and helps Ellen's family restore her place in the community. He does so by convincing the van der Luydens, the leading New York family, to host a dinner for her.

Ellen meets financier Julius Beaufort, who entered New York society by marrying into the Townsend family. His status ensures he is treated courteously, but his philandering makes him widely disliked. Julius begins flirting with Ellen but meets his (social) end when the New York elite — sick of his indiscretions — refuses to bail him out during a financial panic.

Archer asks May to marry him. Although she senses he is not ready, she accepts. May's intuition proves to be correct. Archer is drawn to Ellen's unconventional views on New York society, which contrast with May's seeming passivity, lack of personality, and fondness for idle leisure.

Ellen attempts to divorce the count, who retaliates by threatening to publicize her supposed adultery. As such an accusation would humiliate the entire Welland family, the community urges Archer to intercede. He sympathizes with Ellen but does his duty and pressures her to call off the divorce.

Realizing that he has fallen in love with Ellen, Archer tries to resolve the issue by urging May to rush into the wedding. Suspicious, May asks him once again if his love is genuine. Archer reassures her that it is.

Nonetheless, Archer cannot help confessing his love to Ellen. Although she loves him back, she declines his advances. Ellen bitterly explains that she was ready to endure the scandal of a divorce but Archer and May were not. To avoid further temptation, she moves to Washington.

May advances the wedding date, and it goes off without a hitch; Ellen declines her invitation. Archer's marriage is comfortable but boring. He eventually arranges to meet Ellen in secret. They admit they still love each other.

The count offers Ellen money and even some personal freedom to return to him. Ellen's family pressures her to take the deal by cutting her personal allowance. However, Ellen declines the offer. Archer and she continue meeting in secret, but Archer's elaborate deceptions arouse May's suspicions. Archer and Ellen decide to make love one time; but before they can do so, Ellen abruptly announces that she is returning to Europe, aided by a generous allowance from her grandmother, Mrs. Mingott.

May throws a lavish farewell party for Ellen. Afterward, May tells Archer that she is pregnant. She admits that she shared the news with Ellen before confirming the pregnancy. Archer realizes that he has gravely underestimated May, who suspected his unconsummated love affair all along. He also realizes that Ellen left America because she could not bring herself to have an affair with a married father and that the entire community has been working behind the scenes to separate him from Ellen, while believing that they already had consummated their love.

A quarter-century passes, during which Archer and May raise three children. May dies of pneumonia, leaving him a widower. Ironically, high society's unwritten rules have faded away, and Archer's son Ted is engaged to the daughter of Beaufort's mistress, who became his second wife.

Ted invites Archer to a father-son holiday in Paris. He reveals that he planned the trip so that Archer could meet Ellen again. Ted says that on her deathbed, May confessed to him that "when she asked you to, you gave up the thing you wanted most." Archer replies, "She never asked me."

Walking to Ellen's apartment together, Archer cannot bring himself to visit her, so sends Ted in his place. He reflects on their time together but also what his wife had done and then walks away.

== Cast ==
- Daniel Day-Lewis as Newland Archer
- Michelle Pfeiffer as Ellen Olenska
- Winona Ryder as May Welland
- Miriam Margolyes as Mrs. Mingott
- Geraldine Chaplin as Mrs. Welland
- Michael Gough as Henry van der Luyden
- Richard E. Grant as Larry Lefferts
- Mary Beth Hurt as Regina Beaufort
- Robert Sean Leonard as Ted Archer
- Norman Lloyd as Mr. Letterblair
- Alec McCowen as Sillerton Jackson
- Siân Phillips as Mrs. Archer
- Carolyn Farina as Janey Archer
- Jonathan Pryce as Rivière
- Alexis Smith as Louisa van der Luyden
- Stuart Wilson as Julius Beaufort
- June Squibb as Mrs. Mingott's Maid
- Joanne Woodward as The Narrator

Cameo appearances

Scorsese's parents, and daughter, the actors Charles Scorsese, Catherine Scorsese, and Domenica Cameron-Scorsese, have a small cameo appearance during the sequence in which Archer meets the countess at the Pennsylvania Terminus in Jersey City. Scorsese himself has a cameo as the "fussy bustling photographer who later takes the official wedding photographs", while Day-Lewis' sister, Tamasin Day-Lewis, has a cameo admiring May's engagement ring—a last minute addition after Scorsese's then-partner, Illeana Douglas, had to dropout, when producer-director Frank Marshall insisted his cast be on-location throughout entire principal photography, on his sophomore feature film, Alive (1993).

== Production ==
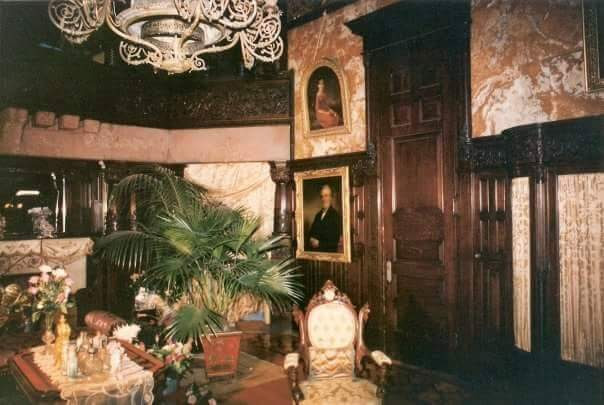
A room in the Paine Mansion—which is now a fraternity house belonging to the Alpha Tau chapter of Pi Kappa Phi at Rensselaer Polytechnic Institute—staged as the dining room for the film.

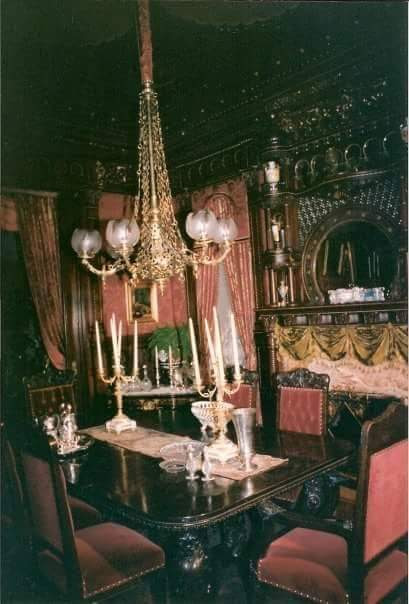
The Moorish Room, staged as a dining room

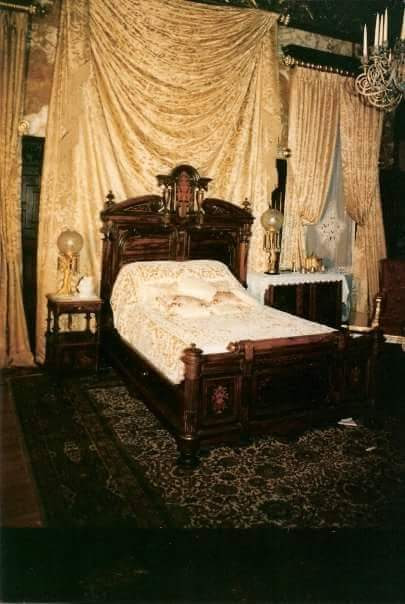
The mansion's dining room staged as a bedroom

The Age of Innocence was filmed on location primarily in Troy, New York. The opera scenes were filmed at the Philadelphia Academy of Music in Philadelphia, Pennsylvania. The scenes set in the home of Mrs. Mingott were filmed in "The Castle", a fraternity house belonging to the Alpha Tau chapter of Pi Kappa Phi at Rensselaer Polytechnic Institute. Formerly known as the Paine Mansion, after its completion in 1896 (then-estimated to cost $500,000), it was heralded as the grandest house in all of Troy. The scenes depicting the country house in snow were filmed inside the circa 1737 Dutch-colonial Luykas Van Alen House, in Kinderhook, New York. Only one major set was built, for an ornate ballroom sequence at the Beaufort residence. The triangular Victorian Gothic Rice Building was used as the setting for the law office.

Director Jamie Babbit began her career as an intern for Scorsese on the film.

=== Writing ===
Scorsese's friend and screenwriter Jay Cocks gave him the Wharton novel in 1980, suggesting that this should be the romantic piece Scorsese should film, as Cocks felt it best represented his sensibility. In Scorsese on Scorsese he noted that

Although the film deals with New York aristocracy and a period of New York history that has been neglected, and although it deals with code and ritual, and with love that's not unrequited but unconsummated—which pretty much covers all the themes I usually deal with—when I read the book, I didn't say, "Oh good, all those themes are here."

=== Graphic design and titles ===
The film's title sequence was created by Elaine and Saul Bass. Bass, himself, noted that the titles were highly ambiguous and metaphoric, and the result of his fascination with time-lapse photography. The sequences' visual symphony of blooming roses and lace were to convey the submerged sensuality and hidden codes of the era. The famous paintings featured in the film were newly created high-quality reproductions. The bursts of color employed as a fade out were inspired by the films Black Narcissus (1947), by Michael Powell, and Rear Window (1954), by Alfred Hitchcock.

== Reception ==
=== Box office ===
The film grossed $32.3 million in the United States and Canada and $68 million worldwide from a $34 million budget.

=== Critical response ===
On review-aggregator website Rotten Tomatoes, the film holds an approval rating of 87% based on 62 reviews, and an average rating of 7.60/10. The site's consensus states: "Equal measures romantic and wistful, Martin Scorsese's elegant adaptation of The Age of Innocence is a triumphant exercise in both stylistic and thematic restraint." On Metacritic, the film has a weighted average score of 90 out of 100, based on 35 critics, indicating "universal acclaim". Audiences polled by CinemaScore gave the film an average grade of "B+" on an A+ to F scale.

In The New York Times, Vincent Canby said, "Taking The Age of Innocence, Edith Wharton's sad and elegantly funny novel about New York's highest society in the 1870s, Martin Scorsese has made a gorgeously uncharacteristic Scorsese film...The film is the work of one of America's handful of master craftsmen." Roger Ebert of the Chicago Sun-Times wrote, "The story told here is brutal and bloody, the story of a man's passion crushed, his heart defeated. Yet it is also much more, and the last scene of the film, which pulls everything together, is almost unbearably poignant." He then added the film to his "Great Movies" collection, and defined the film as "one of Scorsese's greatest".

Peter Travers of Rolling Stone wrote, "A superlative cast catches Wharton's urgency. Ryder, at her loveliest, finds the guile in the girlish May – she'll use any ruse that will help her hold on to Archer. Day-Lewis is smashing as the man caught between his emotions and the social ethic. Not since Olivier in Wuthering Heights has an actor matched piercing intelligence with such imposing good looks and physical grace. Pfeiffer gives the performance of a lifetime as the outcast countess." Desson Howe of The Washington Post wrote, "There's an alert, thinking presence behind the camera. And, in front of the camera, performers Daniel Day-Lewis, Michelle Pfeiffer and Winona Ryder suffuse this saga of repressed longing and spiritual suffering with elegant authority.... Known primarily for modern street pictures, such as Taxi Driver and GoodFellas, Scorsese shows he can flex an entirely different set of muscles and still make a great movie." Todd McCarthy of Variety said, "For sophisticated viewers with a taste for literary adaptations and visits to the past, there is a great deal here to savor....Day-Lewis cuts an impressive figure as Newland... The two principal female roles are superbly filled.... Scorsese brings great energy to what could have been a very static story, although his style is more restrained and less elaborate than usual." Rita Kempley, also of The Washington Post, wrote, "Perhaps it shouldn't come as such a grand surprise that he [Martin Scorsese] is as deft at exploring the nuances of Edwardian manners as he is the laws of modern-day machismo." Time Out said, "The performances are excellent, while the director employs all the tools of his trade to bring his characters and situations vividly to life... Scorsese's most poignantly moving film."

In contrast to the positive reviews, Marc Savlov in the Austin Chronicle wrote, "At two hours and 13 minutes, Scorsese has allowed himself enough time to follow Wharton's book to the letter, and also enough time to include long stretches of painfully wearisome society functions and banter. As a period piece, it's a joy to behold, but with such an indecisive little newt of a protagonist, it's just hard to give a damn what happens."

The Age of Innocence placed as the fourth best film of 1993 in a poll of 107 film critics, as it was named on over 50 lists.

== Accolades ==
At the Academy Awards, The Age of Innocence won the Academy Award for Best Costume Design (Gabriella Pescucci), and was nominated for Best Supporting Actress (Winona Ryder), Best Adapted Screenplay (Jay Cocks, Martin Scorsese), Best Original Score (Elmer Bernstein) and Best Art Direction (Dante Ferretti, Robert J. Franco). At the Golden Globe Awards, The Age of Innocence won the Golden Globe Award for Best Supporting Actress - Motion Picture (Winona Ryder), and was nominated for the awards for Best Motion Picture – Drama, Best Director – Motion Picture (Martin Scorsese) and Best Actress – Motion Picture Drama (Michelle Pfeiffer). At the British Academy Film Awards (BAFTAs), The Age of Innocence won the BAFTA Award for Best Actress in a Supporting Role (Miriam Margolyes). The film received another nomination in this category, for Winona Ryder, and was also nominated for the awards for Best Cinematography (Michael Ballhaus) and Best Production Design (Dante Ferretti).

In addition to her Academy Award and BAFTA Award nominations and Golden Globe Award win, Winona Ryder won the National Board of Review Award for Best Supporting Actress and the Southeastern Film Critics Association Award for Best Supporting Actress. In addition to his Academy Award and Golden Globe Award nominations, Martin Scorsese won the National Board of Review Award for Best Director and the Elvira Notari Prize at the Venice Film Festival (shared with Michelle Pfeiffer), as well as a nomination for the Directors Guild of America Award for Outstanding Directing - Feature Film. Elmer Bernstein was nominated for the Grammy Award for Best Instrumental Composition Written for a Motion Picture or Television.

Awarding Body	Award	Nominee	Result
Academy Awards	Best Supporting Actress	Winona Ryder	Nominated
Academy Awards	Best Adapted Screenplay	Jay Cocks, Martin Scorsese	Nominated
Academy Awards	Best Art Direction	Dante Ferretti and Robert J. Franco	Nominated
Academy Awards	Best Costume Design	Gabriella Pescucci	Won
Academy Awards	Best Original Score	Elmer Bernstein	Nominated
British Academy Film Awards	Best Actress in a Supporting Role	Miriam Margolyes	Won
British Academy Film Awards	Best Actress in a Supporting Role	Winona Ryder	Nominated
British Academy Film Awards	Best Cinematography	Michael Ballhaus	Nominated
British Academy Film Awards	Best Production Design	Dante Ferretti	Nominated
Directors Guild of America Awards	Outstanding Directorial Achievement in Motion Pictures	Martin Scorsese	Nominated
Golden Globe Awards	Best Motion Picture – Drama		Nominated
Golden Globe Awards	Best Director – Motion Picture	Martin Scorsese	Nominated
Golden Globe Awards	Best Actress – Motion Picture Drama	Michelle Pfeiffer	Nominated
Golden Globe Awards	Best Supporting Actress – Motion Picture	Winona Ryder	Won
Grammy Awards	Grammy Award for Best Instrumental Composition Written for a Motion Picture or Television	Elmer Bernstein	Nominated
National Board of Review	Best Director	Martin Scorsese	Won
National Board of Review	Best Supporting Actress	Winona Ryder	Won
Southeastern Film Critics Association	Southeastern Film Critics Association Award for Best Supporting Actress	Winona Ryder	Won
Venice Film Festival	Elvira Notari Prize	Martin Scorsese and Michelle Pfeiffer	Won

== Soundtrack ==
The Age of Innocence

Film score by Elmer Bernstein
- Released: September 14, 1993
- Recorded: June 1993; The Hit Factory, New York City, New York
- Genre: Film score
- Length: 1:04:25
- Label: Epic Soundtrax
- Producers: Elmer Bernstein, Emilie A. Bernstein

Elmer Bernstein chronology
Mad Dog and Glory (1993)	The Age of Innocence (1993)	The Good Son (1993)

External audio
- You may hear Elmer Bernstein's film score for the movie The Age of Innocence performed by the London Philharmonic in 1993 Here on archive.org

The film score for The Age of Innocence was composed by Elmer Bernstein, who had previously collaborated with Scorsese on Cape Fear (1991).

The film starts with a duet scene (Margherita and Faust: Il se fait tard! ...adieu! Act 3) from the opera Faust from Charles Gounod.

=== Track listing ===
All songs written by Elmer Bernstein except as noted.

1. The Age of Innocence – 4:37
2. At the Opera (Gounod's Faust) – 3:11
3. Radetzsky March (Bernstein and Johann Strauss I) (performed by Bernstein feat. Berlin Radio Symphony Orchestra) – 2:16
4. Emperor Waltz, Op. 437 / Tales from the Vienna Woods (Bernstein and Johann Strauss I) (performed by Bernstein feat. Berlin Radio Symphony Orchestra) – 2:26
5. Mrs. Mingott – 1:42
6. Dangerous Conversation – 2:32
7. Slighted – 0:58
8. Van Der Luydens – 2:17
9. First Visit – 2:28
10. Roses Montage – 1:19
11. Ellen's Letter – 2:05
12. Archer's Books – 2:08
13. Mrs. Mingott's Help – 3:49
14. Archer Pleads – 1:48
15. Passage of Time – 2:44
16. Archery – 1:28
17. Ellen at the Store – 2:14
18. Blenker at the Farm – 2:38
19. Boston Common – 0:53
20. Parker House – 1:16
21. Pick up Ellen – 2:12
22. Conversation With Letterblair – 2:33
23. Archer Leaves – 1:03
24. Farewell Dinner – 2:04
25. Ellen Leaves – 2:42
26. In Paris – 1:12
27. Ellen's House – 0:48
28. Madame Olenska – 2:17
29. End Credits – 5:04

== Bibliography ==
- Cahir, Linda Costanza (1993). "The Perils of Politeness in a New Age: Edith Wharton, Martin Scorsese and "The Age of Innocence"". Edith Wharton Review. 10 (2): 12–14, 19. JSTOR 43512826.
- Tibbetts, John C.; Welsh, James M., eds. (2005). The Encyclopedia of Novels Into Film. Checkmark Books. ISBN 978-1859835203.
