= D'Mitch Davis =

American actor and musician

- Born: July 15, 1941 (age 85); Shreveport, Louisiana, U.S.
- Occupations: Actor, musician
- Years active: 1973-2011
- Website: http://nstincts4ever.com/

D’Mitch Davis (born July 15, 1941) is an American actor and musician best known for his roles as the Axminster in the 1990s TV show MacGyver, and the Bartender in the 1985 film Weird Science.

== Filmography ==
Year	Title	Role	Notes
1973	Mean Streets	Cop	
1976	The Rockford Files	Guard	Uncredited
1976	Swashbuckler	Bath Attendant	
1976	Police Story	Phillip Hanzer	
1985	Weird Science	Bartender	
1985	MacGyver	Axminster	
1991	Amen	Deacon Willis	
1995	The Fresh Prince of Bel-Air	Sheriff	
2002	She Spies	Clebert	
2003	Judge Koan	Frank	

== Discography ==
- Ageless (2010)
