= Made in Milan =

- Directed by: Martin Scorsese
- Written by: Jay Cocks
- Produced by: Barbara De Fina
- Starring: Giorgio Armani
- Cinematography: Néstor Almendros
- Edited by: Thelma Schoonmaker
- Music by: Howard Shore
- Release date: 1990
- Running time: 20 minutes
- Country: United States
- Language: Italian

Made in Milan is a 1990 short documentary film about fashion designer Giorgio Armani; it shows him preparing for a show and discusses his ideas about fashion, his family history and the city of Milan. It was directed by Martin Scorsese. It was Scorsese's first short film and documentary since the 1978 film American Boy: A Profile of Steven Prince.
