= Haig P. Manoogian =

American academic (1916–1980)

Haig Manoogian (/ˈheɪɡ məˈnuːdʒiən/; May 23, 1916 – May 26, 1980) was an Armenian-American professor of film at New York University who served as the main influence for many filmmakers such as Martin Scorsese, who was a student of his at New York University. Martin Scorsese called Manoogian's teaching “The most precious gift I have ever received.” In 1966 Basic Books published his textbook The Film-Maker's Art.

== Martin Scorsese ==
Manoogian co-produced Martin Scorsese's first feature film Who's That Knocking at My Door, and Scorsese later dedicated the film Raging Bull to him. Scorsese has since named Manoogian as one of his largest inspirations.
