= Mean Streets =

1973 film by Martin Scorsese

- Theatrical release poster
- Directed by: Martin Scorsese
- Screenplay by: Martin Scorsese; Mardik Martin
- Story by: Martin Scorsese
- Produced by: Jonathan T. Taplin
- Starring: Robert De Niro; Harvey Keitel; David Proval; Amy Robinson; Richard Romanus; Cesare Danova
- Cinematography: Kent L. Wakeford
- Edited by: Sidney Levin; Martin Scorsese (uncredited)
- Production company: Taplin-Perry-Scorsese Productions
- Distributed by: Warner Bros. Pictures
- Release date: October 14, 1973
- Running time: 112 minutes
- Country: United States
- Languages: English; Italian
- Budget: $650,000
- Box office: $3 million

Mean Streets is a 1973 American crime drama film directed by Martin Scorsese, from a screenplay co-written with Mardik Martin. It stars Harvey Keitel and Robert De Niro, along with David Proval, Amy Robinson, Richard Romanus, and Cesare Danova. Scorsese's third feature film, it depicts a group of troubled young men in New York's Little Italy, and centers on many themes the director would later revisit, including the Mafia, Italian-American identity, urban life, and Catholic guilt.

Produced independently and released by Warner Bros. Pictures on October 2, 1973, Mean Streets received positive reviews from critics and marked Scorsese's arrival as a major figure of the New Hollywood movement. Robert De Niro won the National Society of Film Critics and the New York Film Critics Circle awards for Best Supporting Actor for his role as "Johnny Boy" Civello.

In 1997, Mean Streets was selected for preservation in the United States National Film Registry by the Library of Congress for being "culturally, historically, or aesthetically significant".

== Plot ==
Charlie Cappa, a young Italian American in the Little Italy neighborhood of New York City, is hampered by his feeling of responsibility toward his reckless younger friend John "Johnny Boy" Civello, a small-time gambler and degenerate who refuses to work and owes money to many loan sharks. Charlie is also having a secret affair with Johnny's cousin Teresa, who has epilepsy and is ostracized because of her condition—especially by Charlie's Uncle Giovanni, a powerful mafioso, and is told to stay away from her. Giovanni also wants Charlie to distance himself from Johnny, saying that "honorable men go with honorable men".

Charlie is torn between his devout Catholicism and his illicit Mafia work for Giovanni. Johnny becomes increasingly self-destructive and disrespectful of his Mafia-connected creditors. Failing to receive redemption in the Church, Charlie seeks it through sacrificing himself on Johnny's behalf. At Tony's bar, a loan shark and friend named Michael comes looking for Johnny again to pay his debts; he has been doing so for a few days and is becoming increasingly frustrated, thinking that Johnny is taking advantage of him and that he is not going to pay up, with Charlie promising to convince Johnny.

To his surprise, Johnny insults him and tells him that he is not going to pay back the money. Michael lunges at Johnny, who pulls a gun. After a tense standoff, Michael walks away and Charlie convinces Johnny that they should leave town for a brief period. Teresa insists on coming with them. Charlie borrows a car and they drive off, leaving the neighborhood without incident.

A car that has been following them suddenly pulls up with Michael at the wheel and his henchman, Jimmy Shorts, in the backseat. Jimmy fires several shots at Charlie's car, hitting Johnny in the neck and Charlie in the arm, causing Charlie to crash the car into a fire hydrant. Teresa is injured in the crash. Johnny is seen in an alley staggering toward a white light that is revealed to be a police car, and Charlie gets out of the crashed vehicle and kneels in the water spurting from the hydrant, dazed and bleeding. Paramedics take Teresa and Charlie away while Johnny's fate remains unknown.

== Cast ==
- Harvey Keitel as Charlie Cappa
- Robert De Niro as John "Johnny Boy" Civello
- David Proval as Tony DeVienazo
- Amy Robinson as Teresa Ronchelli
- Richard Romanus as Michael Longo
- Cesare Danova as Giovanni Cappa
- Victor Argo as Mario
- George Memmoli as Joey
- Lenny Scaletta as Jimmy
- Jeannie Bell as Diane
- Murray Moston as Oscar
- Lois Walden as Jewish Girl
- David Carradine as Drunk
- Robert Carradine as Gunman
- D'Mitch Davis as Cop
- Harry Northup as Soldier

Uncredited

- Martin Scorsese as Jimmy Shorts
- Catherine Scorsese as Woman on Landing

== Development ==
Apart from his first actual feature, Who's That Knocking at My Door, this was Scorsese's first feature film of his own design. Director John Cassavetes told him after he completed his second film, Boxcar Bertha, a directing project given to him by early independent filmmaker Roger Corman: "You’ve just spent a year of your life making a piece of shit." This inspired Scorsese to make a film about his own experiences, inspired by his upbringing in New York's Little Italy. Cassavetes told Scorsese he should do something like Who's That Knocking at My Door, which Cassavetes had liked.

== Production ==
=== Writing ===
The screenplay began as a continuation of the characters in Who's That Knocking. Scorsese and Mardik Martin worked on-and-off on the script, whose working title was Season of the Witch, for seven years. Scorsese changed the title from Season of the Witch to Mean Streets, a reference to Raymond Chandler's essay "The Simple Art of Murder", where Chandler writes, "But down these mean streets a man must go who is not himself mean, who is neither tarnished nor afraid." The title was recommended by Jay Cocks, then a film critic, who later became a screenwriter.

Scorsese sent the script to Corman, who agreed to back the film if all the characters were black. Scorsese was anxious to make the film so he considered this option, but actress Verna Bloom arranged a meeting with potential financial backer Jonathan Taplin, the road manager for The Band. Taplin liked the script and was willing to raise the $300,000 Scorsese wanted if Corman promised, in writing, to distribute the film. The blaxploitation suggestion came to nothing when funding from Warner Bros. Pictures allowed him to make the film with Italian-American characters.

=== Casting ===
Originally, the film's financiers wanted Jon Voight in the role of Charlie, but he turned them down. Robert De Niro requested the part, but Scorsese cast Harvey Keitel, as he'd written the character with Keitel in mind. De Niro and Keitel considered switching roles, but Scorsese vetoed it.

Martin Scorsese provides the voiceover narration heard throughout the film despite not appearing as a character in it, a technique he borrowed from Federico Fellini's I Vitelloni (1953).

=== Filming ===
Principal photography lasted 27 days, between April and June 1973. Due to the low budget, the majority of the film's interiors were shot in Los Angeles, with seven days of location shooting in New York City. The church scenes were filmed at St. Patrick's Old Cathedral in Little Italy, while the 'Volpe Bar' was a restaurant in the Nolita neighborhood of Manhattan. Many scenes were shot without permits, with Scorsese calling favors from his old friends and neighbors, including Francis Ford Coppola.

Many of the crew were veterans of Roger Corman productions, and students from New York University, to keep costs down. Cinematographer Kent L. Wakeford was a veteran documentary cameraman who had never shot a feature film before.

The scenes where Harvey Keitel and Robert De Niro fight with trash cans and talk behind the bar were completely improvised by the actors.

== Release ==
=== Home media ===
Mean Streets was released on VHS and Betamax in 1985. The film debuted as a letterboxed LaserDisc on October 7, 1991, in the US. It was released on Blu-ray on April 6, 2011, in France, and in America on July 17, 2012. The film received a 4K Ultra HD and Blu-ray release from The Criterion Collection on November 21, 2023.

The film also received a 4K Ultra HD and Blu-ray release from Second Sight on January 15, 2024.

== Reception ==
=== Critical response ===
Mean Streets received immense critical acclaim on its release. On Rotten Tomatoes, the film holds an approval rating of 92% based on 78 reviews, with an average rating of 8.9/10. The website's critics consensus reads: "Mean Streets is a powerful tale of urban sin and guilt that marks Scorsese's arrival as an important cinematic voice and features electrifying performances from Harvey Keitel and Robert De Niro." Metacritic, which uses a weighted average, assigned the film a score of 96 out of 100, based on 11 critics, indicating "universal acclaim".

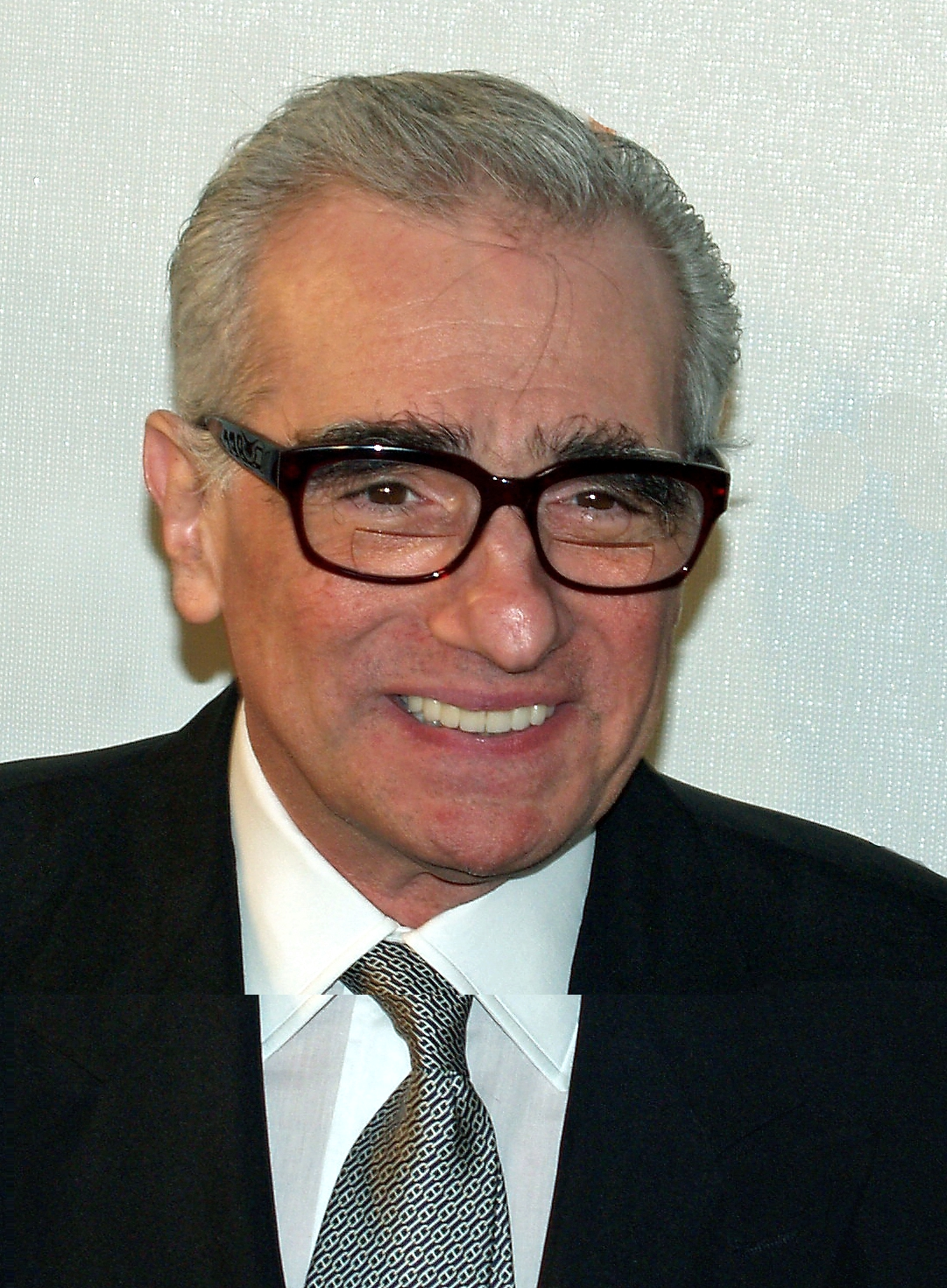
Director Martin Scorsese

Pauline Kael of The New Yorker was among the enthusiastic critics, calling it "a true original of our period, a triumph of personal filmmaking" and "dizzyingly sensual".

Vincent Canby of The New York Times reflected that "no matter how bleak the milieu, no matter how heartbreaking the narrative, some films are so thoroughly, beautifully realized they have a kind of tonic effect that has no relation to the subject matter".

David Denby, writing for Sight and Sound, praised the film's acting, saying that Scorsese had used improvisation "better than anyone in American movies so far". He concluded by saying, "Scorsese's impulse to express all he feels about life in every scene (a cannier, more prudent director wouldn't have started his film with that great De Niro monologue), and thus to wrench his audience upwards into a new state of consciousness with one prolonged and devastating gesture, infinitely hurting and infinitely tender. Mean Streets comes close enough to this feverish ideal to warrant our love and much of our respect."

Retrospectively, Roger Ebert of the Chicago Sun-Times inducted Mean Streets on his Great Movies list and wrote: "In countless ways, right down to the detail of modern TV crime shows, Mean Streets is one of the source points of modern movies."

In 2011, Empire listed the film as #1 on its "50 Greatest American Independent Films" list. Additionally, in 2013 Entertainment Weekly staff voted the film the seventh greatest of all time. In 2015, it was ranked 93rd on the BBC's list of the 100 greatest American films. The film also appeared on "Variety's 100 Greatest Films of All Time" list in 2022.

In 1997, Mean Streets was selected for preservation in the United States National Film Registry by the Library of Congress as "culturally, historically, or aesthetically significant".

=== Awards and nominations ===
Award	Year	Category	Nominee(s)	Result
Nastro d'Argento	1976	Best Foreign Director	Martin Scorsese	Nominated
National Society of Film Critics Award	1974	Best Film	—N/a	2nd place (Note: Tied with Last Tango in Paris.)
National Society of Film Critics Award	1974	Best Actor	Harvey Keitel	6th place
National Society of Film Critics Award	1974	Best Actor	Robert De Niro	4th place
National Society of Film Critics Award	1974	Best Supporting Actor	Robert De Niro	Won
New York Film Critics Circle Award	1973	Best Supporting Actor	Robert De Niro	Won
Writers Guild of America Awards	1974	Best Original Screenplay	Martin Scorsese, Mardik Martin	Nominated

== Soundtrack ==
Scorsese mainly used vintage pop songs as the movie soundtrack, a revolutionary move at the time. The use of the song "Be My Baby" by the Ronettes, at the start of the film is considered one of the most memorable moments of Scorsese's career, and according to critic Owen Gleiberman, "arguably the single greatest use of a pop song in Hollywood history". Lucy Sante wrote "Mean Streets changed soundtracks forever."

Other songs that appear on the film are:

- "Tell Me" by The Rolling Stones
- "I Looked Away" by Derek and the Dominos
- "Jumpin' Jack Flash" by The Rolling Stones
- "Desiree" by The Charts
- "I Met Him on a Sunday" by The Shirelles
- "Florence" by The Paragons
- "Those Oldies but Goodies" by Little Caesar and The Romans
- "Please Mr. Postman" by The Marvelettes
- "You" by The Aquatones
- "It's in His Kiss" by Betty Everett
- "I Love You So" by The Chantels
- "Ship of Love" by The Nutmegs
- "Rubber Biscuit" by The Chips
- "Pledging My Love" by Johnny Ace
- "Baby Oh Baby" by The Shells
- "Mickey's Monkey" by The Miracles
- "Stepping Out" by Cream

== See also ==
- List of American films of 1973
- List of cult films
