= Mardik Martin =

American screenwriter (1934–2019)

- Մարդիկ Մարտին
- Born: September 16, 1934; Abadan, Khuzestan, Persia (present-day Iran)
- Died: September 11, 2019 (aged 84); Studio City, California, U.S.
- Citizenship: United States
- Education: New York University
- Occupation: Screenwriter
- Years active: 1964-2014
- Notable work: Mean Streets; New York, New York; Raging Bull

Mardik Vartan Martin (Armenian: Մարդիկ Վարդան Մարտին; September 16, 1934 – September 11, 2019) was an Armenian-American screenwriter and teacher. He was best known for writing or co-writing the scripts for Mean Streets, New York, New York and Raging Bull – all directed by his lifelong friend Martin Scorsese and starring Robert De Niro.

== Early life ==
Martin was born in Abadan, Iran to ethnic Armenian parents Vartan and Hranush Martin, who had emigrated there as refugees from the Armenian genocide. They later moved to Baghdad, Iraq. Although his family in Iraq was wealthy, he fled the country shortly before turning 18 to avoid the draft, and arrived in New York City in a penniless state. Martin attended NYU, where he met fellow student Martin Scorsese in 1961. He graduated with a Master's Degree in screenwriting in 1968.

== Career ==
Martin and Scorsese formed a close friendship and worked together on Scorsese's early projects such as It's Not Just You, Murray! and the semi-autobiographical Season of the Witch, which ultimately became Mean Streets. According to Hollywood biographer Peter Biskind, "The two young men sat in Martin's Plymouth Valiant and wrote. In the winter, in the cold and snow." Martin also shared writing credits on the Scorsese films New York, New York (with Earl Mac Rauch) and Raging Bull (with Paul Schrader).

In 2012, Martin was honored by the Parajanov-Vartanov Institute "for the mastery of his pen on iconic American films" such as Mean Streets and Raging Bull.

In 2014, Martin co-wrote the screenplay of the German drama The Cut, which won a special mention by the Young Jury Members of the Vittorio Veneto Film Festival for its director Fatih Akin at the 2014 Venice Film Festival.

Martin also taught screenwriting at NYU's Tisch School of the Arts and the USC School of Cinematic Arts.

He is among the screenwriters on Writers Guild of America list of 101 Greatest Screenplays (for Raging Bull).

== Personal life ==
According to Martin, he abused substances during the 1980s and '90s that cost him multiple screenwriting jobs, including Carlito's Way.

=== Death ===
Martin died of unknown causes on September 11, 2019. He was found dead in his house five days before his 85th birthday.

== Filmography ==
=== Feature films ===
Year	Title	Director	Notes
1967	Who's That Knocking at My Door	Martin Scorsese	As assistant director
1971	Revenge Is My Destiny	Joseph Adler	Co-writer with Adler
1973	Mean Streets	Martin Scorsese	Co-writer with Scorsese
1977	New York, New York	Martin Scorsese	Co-writer with Earl Mac Rauch
1977	Valentino	Ken Russell	Co-writer with Russell
1978	The Last Waltz	Martin Scorsese	
1980	Raging Bull	Martin Scorsese	Co-writer with Paul Schrader
2014	The Cut	Fatih Akin	Co-writer with Akin

=== Short films ===
Year	Title	Director	Notes
1964	It's Not Just You, Murray!	Martin Scorsese	Also assistant director

=== Documentaries ===
Year	Title	Director	Notes
1974	Italianamerican	Martin Scorsese	Co-writer with Lawrence D. Cohen
1978	The Last Waltz	Martin Scorsese	
1978	American Boy: A Profile of Steven Prince	Martin Scorsese	Co-writer with Julia Cameron
2008	Mardik: Baghdad to Hollywood	Ramy Katrib; Evan York	

== Awards and nominations ==
Year	Institution	Category	Work	Result	Ref.
1974	Writers Guild of America	Best Original Screenplay	Mean Streets	Nominated	
1981	Golden Globe Awards	Best Screenplay	Raging Bull	Nominated	
2007	Arpa International Film Festival	Lifetime Achievement Award	—N/a	Won	
