= Made in England: The Films of Powell and Pressburger =

- Film poster
- Directed by: David Hinton
- Produced by: Nick Varley; Matthew Wells
- Narrated by: Martin Scorsese
- Cinematography: Ronan Killeen
- Edited by: Margarida Cartaxo
- Music by: Adrian Johnston
- Production companies: Ten Thousand 86; Ice Cream Films
- Distributed by: Altitude Film Distribution
- Release dates: 21 February 2024 (Berlin International Film Festival); 10 May 2024 (United Kingdom)
- Running time: 133 minutes
- Country: United Kingdom
- Language: English
- Box office: $71,043

Made in England: The Films of Powell and Pressburger is a 2024 British documentary film directed by David Hinton. Martin Scorsese narrates the film, as he reflects on the influence of filmmakers Michael Powell and Emeric Pressburger, whose decades-long collaboration led to a series of classics that made the duo a crucial part of British cinema.

The film premiered at the Berlin International Film Festival on 21 February 2024, and was released in the United Kingdom on 10 May 2024, to acclaim from critics.

== Synopsis ==
Martin Scorsese first encountered the films of Powell and Pressburger as a child, sitting in front of the family TV. When The Archers’ famous logo appeared on screen, Scorsese recalls: “You knew you were in for fantasy, wonder, magic – real film magic.” Now, in this documentary, he tells the story of his lifelong love affair with their movies, including The Life and Death of Colonel Blimp, Black Narcissus, The Red Shoes and The Tales of Hoffmann. “Certain films you simply run all the time and you live with them,” says Scorsese. “As you grow older they grow deeper. I’m not sure how it happens, but it does. For me, that body of work is a wondrous presence, a constant source of energy, and a reminder of what life and art are all about.” Drawing on a rich array of archive material, Scorsese explores in full the collaboration between the Englishman Powell and the Hungarian Pressburger who thrived in the face of adversity during World War II but were eventually brought low by the film industry of the 1950s. Scorsese celebrates the duo’s ability to create “subversive commercial movies” and describes how deeply their films have influenced his own work.

— Berlin International Film Festival

== Release ==
Made in England: The Films of Powell and Pressburger premiered as part of the Specials segment at the Berlin International Film Festival on 21 February 2024. It also premiered at the Hot Docs International Film Festival on 27 April 2024. The film was released in cinemas in the United Kingdom on 10 May 2024.

== Reception ==
On the review aggregator website Rotten Tomatoes, 99% of 73 critics' reviews are positive. The website's consensus reads: "Leading audiences through The Archers' filmography with Martin Scorsese as their masterful guide, Made in England is an entertaining and rich education." Metacritic, which uses a weighted average, assigned the film a score of 83 out of 100, based on 22 critics, indicating "universal acclaim".
