= The Big Shave =

- Directed by: Martin Scorsese
- Written by: Martin Scorsese
- Starring: Peter Bernuth
- Cinematography: Ares Demertzis
- Release dates: December 1967 (Knokke-le-Zoute Film Festival); October 1968 (New York Film Festival)
- Running time: 6 minutes
- Country: United States
- Language: English

The Big Shave is a 1967 six-minute body horror short film directed by Martin Scorsese. It is also known as Viet '67.

== Home media ==
In May 2020, it was made available on DVD/Blu-ray by The Criterion Collection as part of a collection of his short films from the 60s and 70s.

== Synopsis ==
Peter Bernuth stars as the recipient of the title shave, repeatedly shaving away hair, then skin, in an increasingly bloody and graphic bathroom scene. Prompted by the film's alternative title, many film critics have interpreted the young man's process of self-mutilation as a metaphor for the self-destructive involvement of the United States in the Vietnam War.

== Production ==
The music accompanying the film is Bunny Berigan's "I Can't Get Started". The film was produced at New York University's Tisch School of the Arts, shot on Agfa color film donated by Palais des Beaux Arts.

== Cultural references ==
- American Dad!: In "The Best Christmas Story Never", Stan travels back in time to 1970 and meets a young Martin Scorsese. When Stan tells the director that he's a big fan, Scorsese says, incredulously, "You saw my six minute film about a guy shaving?!"

== See also ==
- List of American films of 1967
- Counterculture of the 1960s
- Experimental film
