= American Boy: A Profile of Steven Prince =

1978 film by Martin Scorsese

- Promotional poster (with Italianamerican)
- Directed by: Martin Scorsese
- Written by: Julia Cameron (treatment); Mardik Martin (treatment)
- Produced by: Bert Lovitt
- Starring: Steven Prince; Martin Scorsese; George Memmoli
- Cinematography: Michael Chapman
- Edited by: Amy Jones; Bert Lovitt
- Distributed by: New Empire Films
- Release date: October 1978
- Running time: 55 minutes
- Country: United States
- Language: English
- Budget: $155,000

American Boy: A Profile of Steven Prince is a 1978 documentary directed by Martin Scorsese. Its subject is Scorsese's friend Steven Prince, known for his small role as Easy Andy, the gun salesman in Taxi Driver. Prince is a raconteur who tells stories about various events in his life.

The Neil Young song "Time Fades Away" is featured in the film.

A sequel, American Prince, was released in 2009 and was directed by Tommy Pallotta.

== Synopsis ==
Martin Scorsese and a small group of friends gather in a living room in Los Angeles with the charismatic Steven Prince. Over the course of the evening, Scorsese films Prince talking about various events in his life with a mixture of humor and gravitas. Prince recalls stories such as being a former drug addict, a road manager for Neil Diamond, and a traumatic event in which he witnessed a boy die by accidental electrocution. Scorsese intersperses home movies of Prince as a child as he talks about his family.

When talking of his years as a heroin addict, he recalls Neil Diamond offering to help Prince get clean, but he refused. Later, however, Prince goes through recovery and remembers being shocked to learn he had a green ceiling in his home. He never noticed before because his eyelids had always been half-closed as an effect of the heroin.

Prince recalls injecting adrenaline into the heart of a woman who overdosed, with the help of a medical dictionary and a Magic Marker. Years later this story was re-enacted by Quentin Tarantino in his screenplay for Pulp Fiction.

Prince also tells a story about his days working at a gas station, and having to shoot a man he caught stealing tires, after the man pulled out a knife and tried to attack him. This story was retold in the Richard Linklater film Waking Life.

== Cast ==
- Steven Prince as Self
- Julia Cameron as Self (uncredited)
- Mardik Martin as Self (uncredited)
- Kathi McGinnis as Self (uncredited)
- George Memmoli as Self (uncredited)
- Martin Scorsese as Self (uncredited)

== Production ==
The film was shot over the course of two weekends.

== Works cited ==
- Wilson, Michael (2011). Scorsese On Scorsese. Cahiers du Cinéma. ISBN 9782866427023.
