= Barbara De Fina =

American film producer

- Born: 1946 (age 79–80); New Jersey, U.S
- Occupation: Film producer
- Spouse: Martin Scorsese (m. 1985; div. 1991)

Barbara De Fina (born 1946) is an American film producer and was producer of many of Martin Scorsese's films.

== Biography ==
Barbara De Fina started working as a production assistant in the entertainment industry and eventually became a production coordinator on films like An Unmarried Woman, The Taking of Pelham 123 and Woody Allen's Interiors.

She worked as a unit manager with Jay Presson Allen on Sidney Lumet's Prince of the City. She was also a unit manager on the film The Chosen.

Her grandfather was from Sicily and her grandmother from Hungary, and she grew up in an immigrant community. She got started in low-budget filmmaking and she became associated with filmmaker Sean Cunningham, working as a producer on Spring Break. De Fina met Martin Scorsese on The King of Comedy, where she worked as a post production supervisor, before meeting with Martin Scorsese again during the making of After Hours. The two were married on February 8, 1985. She then produced The Color of Money with Irving Axelrad.

Among her films are Goodfellas, The Age of Innocence,, the Life Lessons segment of New York Stories, Casino, The Last Temptation of Christ Cape Fear, Kundun, Bringing Out The Dead, as well as the documentary My Voyage To Italy, and Dangerous Edge, a documentary about Graham Green, and The Grifters.

Barbara executive produced Scorsese's films Goodfellas and Hugo. She worked with the director Stephen Frears, executive producing The Grifters, and producing The Hi Lo Country. She produced Kicked in the Head with Matthew Harrison directing, and You Can Count on Me with Kenneth Lonergan directing as well as The Mesmerist with Gil Cates Jr. directing, Brides with Pantelis Voulgaris directing, and Lymelife with Derick Martini directing. In 2001, she and the production team of the film You Can Count on Me were presented the Independent Spirit Award for Best First Feature.

She developed Me the Mob and the Music based on the book of the same title by Tommy James and Martin Fitzpatrick, and Cassino in Ischia directed by Frank Ciota and written by Joe Ciota.

Barbara De Fina also produced Michael Jackson's music video "Bad" with Martin Scorsese.

De Fina and Scorsese divorced in 1991, but continued working together on projects for decades after that.

== Awards and nominations ==
Year	Award	Category	Title	Result
1998	Australian Film Institute Awards	Best Foreign Film	Kundun	Nominated
2016	Awards Circuit Community Awards	Best Motion Picture	Silence	Nominated
2017	Gold Derby Awards	Motion Picture	Silence	Nominated
