= Charles Scorsese =

American actor (1913–1993)

- Scorsese in Italianamerican (1974)
- Born: Luciano Charles Scorsese; May 8, 1913; New York City, U.S.
- Died: August 23, 1993 (aged 80); New York City, U.S.
- Occupation: Actor
- Years active: 1974–1993
- Spouse: Catherine Cappa (m. 1933)
- Children: 2, including Martin

Luciano Charles Scorsese (May 8, 1913 – August 23, 1993) was an American film actor. He was the father of filmmaker Martin Scorsese.

Scorsese was born in New York City, the son of Teresa and Francesco Scorsese, Sicilian immigrants from Polizzi Generosa, a small town near Palermo. He attended Public School 21.

He worked as a presser for over forty years and also as a wardrobe consultant. He married Catherine Cappa in 1933. He was the father of Academy Award-winning film director Martin Scorsese, and began playing small or bit roles in films from the mid-1970s, mainly in his son's productions, but occasionally worked with other directors.

Scorsese died after a long illness in 1993, aged 80. His last film role was in The Age of Innocence, which was released after his death.

== Filmography ==
Year	Title	Role	Notes
1974	Italianamerican	Himself	Documentary
1976	Taxi Driver	Burt Steensma, Iris' Father	Uncredited, (newspaper article)
1980	Raging Bull	Charlie	
1982	The King of Comedy	First Man at Bar	
1984	The Muppets Take Manhattan	Extra	Uncredited
1985	After Hours	Club Berlin Patron	Uncredited
1986	Wise Guys	Birthday Guest #11	
1986	The Color of Money	High Roller #1	
1987	Moonstruck	Customer in Bakery	Uncredited
1990	Goodfellas	Vinnie	
1991	The Hard Way	Senior Citizen	Uncredited
1991	Cape Fear	Fruitstand Customer	
1993	The Age of Innocence	Elderly Man at Jersey City Station	Uncredited, (final film role) (posthumous)
