= Catherine Scorsese =

American actress (1912–1997)

- Scorsese in Italianamerican (1974)
- Born: Catherine Cappa; April 16, 1912; New York City, U.S.
- Died: January 6, 1997 (aged 84); New York City, U.S.
- Occupation: Actress
- Years active: 1964–1995
- Spouse: Charles Scorsese (m. 1933; died 1993)
- Children: 2, including Martin

Catherine Scorsese (née Cappa; April 16, 1912 – January 6, 1997) was an American actress. She was the mother of filmmaker Martin Scorsese.

== Early life ==
Catherine Cappa was born on April 16, 1912, in New York to Sicilian parents Domenica and Martin Cappa. Her father, Martin, was a stage co-ordinator and her mother, Domenica, was a shop owner. She had a twin brother, named Charles, as well as two other brothers, Salvatore and Andrew, and five sisters, including Mary and Sarah.

Catherine grew up in a three-room apartment on Elizabeth Street, on the outer reaches of Manhattan's Little Italy, which was shared with 14 people, including boarders and relatives.

== Career ==
Scorsese began acting when her son Martin Scorsese cast her in his short film It's Not Just You, Murray!. Scorsese was of Italian descent and frequently played the role of an Italian mother. She is perhaps best known for her appearance in her son's film Goodfellas as Mrs. DeVito, the mother of Joe Pesci's character Tommy. She also published a recipe book, Italianamerican: The Scorsese Family Cookbook.

== Personal life ==
In 1933, when she was working as a machinist in the nearby Garment District, she married Luciano Charles Scorsese, a fellow Sicilian American who also lived on Elizabeth Street and was also employed in the garment industry. The experience of growing up in Little Italy among first- and second-generation Italian Americans had a profound influence on her son Martin, who revisited their attitudes, values and way of life in his 1974 documentary, Italianamerican.

She often cooked meals for cast and crew members of her son's films. Her cookbook, Italianamerican: The Scorsese Family Cookbook, was published two months before her death.

== Death ==
Scorsese, who had Alzheimer's disease, died on January 6, 1997.

== Filmography ==
Year	Title	Role	Notes
1964	It's Not Just You, Murray!	Mother	Short
1967	Who's That Knocking at My Door	Mother	
1973	Mean Streets	Woman on Landing	uncredited
1974	Italianamerican	Self	Documentary
1976	Taxi Driver	Iris' Mother	Uncredited
1982	The King of Comedy	Rupert's Mom	
1983	Easy Money	Nicky Cerone's Mother	Uncredited
1984	The Muppets Take Manhattan	Extra	Uncredited
1985	After Hours	Elderly women at the Café	Uncredited
1986	Wise Guys	Birthday party guest	
1987	Moonstruck	Customer at Bakery	
1990	Goodfellas	Mrs. DeVito	
1990	The Godfather Part III	Woman in Cafe	
1991	Cape Fear	Fruitstand Customer	
1993	The Age of Innocence	Elderly Woman	Uncredited
1994	Men Lie	Granddaughter Witness	
1995	Casino	Piscano's Mother	Final Film Role
