= Jay Cocks =

American screenwriter

John C. "Jay" Cocks Jr. (born January 12, 1944) is an American film critic and screenwriter. He is a graduate of Kenyon College. He was a critic for Time, Newsweek and Rolling Stone, among other magazines before shifting to screenplay writing. For his work, Cocks has received three Academy Award nominations: two for Best Adapted Screenplay — The Age of Innocence (1993) and A Complete Unknown (2024) — and one for Best Original Screenplay (Gangs of New York) (2002).

== Career ==
As a screenwriter, he is notable for his collaborations with director Martin Scorsese, particularly The Age of Innocence and Gangs of New York — a screenplay he started working on in 1976 — as well as Kathryn Bigelow's Strange Days. He did an uncredited rewrite of James Cameron's screenplay for Titanic and was, with Scorsese, the co-screenwriter of Silence. Cocks and Scorsese approached author Philip K. Dick in 1969 for an adaptation of his 1968 novel Do Androids Dream of Electric Sheep? Though the duo never optioned the book, it was later developed into the movie Blade Runner by screenwriter Hampton Fancher and director Ridley Scott.

Under the pseudonym "Joseph P. Gillis", Cocks and filmmaker Brian De Palma wrote a spec script for the crime drama television series Columbo in 1973. Their teleplay, titled "Shooting Script", was never filmed. De Palma and Cocks did, however, contribute in part with helping George Lucas with the narrative crawl that opens the 1977 film Star Wars.

== Personal life ==
Cocks married actress Verna Bloom in 1972. Bloom, with Cocks, had a son, Sam, born in 1981. Bloom died in 2019.

== Filmography ==
Year	Title	Director	Notes
1988	The Last Temptation of Christ	Martin Scorsese	Uncredited
1990	Made in Milan	Martin Scorsese	Documentary short
1993	The Age of Innocence	Martin Scorsese	Credited with Martin Scorsese
1995	Strange Days	Kathryn Bigelow	Credited with James Cameron
2002	Gangs of New York	Martin Scorsese	Credited with Steve Zaillian & Kenneth Lonergan
2004	De-Lovely	Irwin Winkler	
2016	Silence	Martin Scorsese	Credited with Martin Scorsese
2024	A Complete Unknown	James Mangold	Credited with James Mangold

Unproduced projects

- Do Androids Dream of Electric Sheep? (1969) – Script for Martin Scorsese
- "Shooting Script" (1973) – Unproduced Columbo teleplay (under the pseudonym Joseph P. Gillis)
- Night Life (1978) – Script for Martin Scorsese
- Untitled satirical comedy (1980) – Script for Brian De Palma
- The Company of Angels (1994) – Script for Kathryn Bigelow
- Ambrose Chapel (1998) – Script for Brian De Palma
- Nazi Gold (1998) – Script for Brian De Palma
- Brownsville Girl (2010) – Script for Scott Cooper
- The Last of the Savages (2023) – Adaptation of the novel

== Awards and nominations ==
Year	Award	Category	Title	Result
1993	Academy Awards	Best Adapted Screenplay	The Age of Innocence	Nominated
2002	Academy Awards	Best Original Screenplay	Gangs of New York	Nominated
2002	BAFTA Awards	Best Original Screenplay	Gangs of New York	Nominated
2002	Writers Guild of America	Best Original Screenplay	Gangs of New York	Nominated
2016	National Board of Review	Best Adapted Screenplay	Silence	Won
2016	Chicago Film Critics Association	Best Adapted Screenplay	Silence	Nominated
2024	Academy Awards	Best Adapted Screenplay	A Complete Unknown	Nominated
2024	BAFTA Awards	Best Adapted Screenplay	A Complete Unknown	Nominated
2024	Writers Guild of America	Best Adapted Screenplay	A Complete Unknown	Nominated
