= It's Not Just You, Murray! =

1964 film by Martin Scorsese

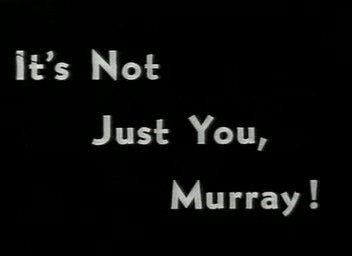
- Directed by: Martin Scorsese
- Written by: Martin Scorsese; Mardik Martin
- Starring: Ira Rubin; Sam De Fazio
- Cinematography: Richard H. Coll
- Edited by: Eli F. Bleich
- Music by: Richard H. Coll
- Release date: September 1966 (New York Film Festival)
- Running time: 15 mins
- Country: United States
- Language: English

It's Not Just You, Murray! (1964) is a short film directed by Martin Scorsese, starring Ira Rubin and Sam De Fazio. The film focuses on Murray, a middle-aged mobster reminiscing about his career without realizing that his success is not all it seems to be. The film premiered at the New York Film Festival in 1966. It's Not Just You, Murray! won various awards including the Producers Guild Award for Best Student Film, and Jesse L Lasky Intercollegiate Award.

== Plot ==
Materialistic middle-aged mobster Murray (Rubin) looks back at his life. He attributes many of his successes to the support and companionship of his friend Joe (De Fazio), claiming that Joe helped him get a job with the Mob and is the reason he met his wife. Murray is overly careful to not reveal his job, but in a way that leaves no doubt he is a mobster. His recollections, delivered in voiceover, are frequently contradicted by memories shown on screen.

Over the course of the film, it becomes clear that Joe has repeatedly backstabbed Murray over the years. The two started out as bootleggers together, but when the cops stormed their distilling operation, Joe fled and left Murray to take the fall. Although Murray revived his Mob career after his release from prison, Joe makes Murray the public face of the operation, and Murray publicly embarrasses himself. In addition, Joe has been sleeping with Murray's wife for years.

One day, Murray mentions that his kids look like Joe. The audio cuts out while Joe and Murray argue. Eventually, Murray declares that Joe's explanation satisfies him. He settles back into his materialism and resumes bragging about how rich and happy he is.

== Cast ==
- Ira Rubin as Murray
- Sam De Fazio (credited as DeFazio) as Joe
- Andrea Martin as Murray's wife
- Catherine Scorsese as Murray's mother

Robert Uricola, Bernard Weisberger, Victor Magnotta, Richard Sweeton, and John Bivona also received acting credits.

== Production ==
The film was made at New York University. The film is 15 minutes long, shot in 16 mm film as black and white film. While working on the film, Martin Scorsese met Laraine Marie Brennan, whom he married. Much of the film was shot in Scorsese's apartment. The story of the film is based on his uncle. Scorsese co-wrote the script with Mardik Martin. The film marked the debut for Scorsese's mother Catherine Scorsese. It later premiered at the New York Film Festival in 1966.

== Reception ==
In 1964, It's Not Just You, Murray! won the Producers Guild Award for Best Student Film. Later, the film won the Jesse L Lasky Intercollegiate Award.

Patricia Cooper and Ken Dancyger wrote that the film is "among the best student films ever made". Mark Asch of Reverse Shot wrote, "The celebration of one's influences—a constant in Scorsese's career—is a characteristic It's Not Just You, Murray! shares with innumerable other student films". Christopher Campbell of Business Insider wrote that the film "features a few more parallels and even seems like a template for a number of later works, including Goodfellas, Casino and now The Wolf of Wall Street." Nora Sayre of The New York Times wrote, "What's pleasing throughout is the way that the narration contradicts what's taking place on the screen".
