= Who's That Knocking at My Door =

1967 film directed by Martin Scorsese

- Theatrical release poster
- Directed by: Martin Scorsese
- Written by: Martin Scorsese
- Produced by: Joseph Weill; Betzi Manoogian; Haig Manoogian
- Starring: Harvey Keitel; Zina Bethune
- Cinematography: Michael Wadley; Richard Coll
- Edited by: Thelma Schoonmaker
- Production company: Trimod Films
- Distributed by: Joseph Brenner Associates
- Release dates: November 15, 1967 (Chicago); September 13, 1968 (United States)
- Running time: 86 minutes
- Country: United States
- Language: English
- Budget: $70,000
- Box office: $16,085

Who's That Knocking at My Door, originally titled I Call First, is a 1967 American independent drama film written and directed by Martin Scorsese which stars Harvey Keitel and Zina Bethune. It was Scorsese's feature film directorial debut and Keitel's debut as an actor. The story follows Italian-American J.R. (Keitel) as he struggles to accept the secret revealed by his independent and free-spirited girlfriend (Bethune).

This film was a nominee at the 1967 Chicago Film Festival.

== Plot ==
J.R. is a typical Catholic Italian-American young man on the streets of New York City. Even as an adult, he stays close to home with a core group of friends with whom he drinks and parties. He gets involved with a local girl he meets on the Staten Island Ferry, and decides he wants to get married and settle down. As their relationship deepens, he declines her offer to have sex because he thinks she is a virgin and he wants to wait rather than "spoil" her.

One day, his girlfriend tells him that she was once raped by a former boyfriend. This crushes J.R., and he rejects her and attempts to return to his old life of drinking with his friends. However, after a particularly wild party with friends, he realizes he still loves her and returns to her apartment one early morning. He awkwardly tells her that he forgives her and says that he will "marry her anyway." Upon hearing this, the girl tells him marriage would never work if her past weighs on him so much. J.R. becomes enraged and calls her a whore, but quickly recants and says he is confused by the whole situation. She tells him to go home, and he returns to the Catholic church, but finds no solace.

== Cast ==
- Zina Bethune as Girl
- Harvey Keitel as J.R.
- Ann Collette as Girl in Dream
- Lennard Kuras as Joey
- Michael Scala as Sally Gaga
- Harry Northup as Harry
- Tuai Yu-Lan as Girl in Dream
- Saskia Holleman as Girl in Dream
- Bill Minkin as Iggy at Party
- Philip Carlson as Boy in Copake
- Wendy Russell as Gaga's Girl
- Robert Uricola as Boy with Gun
- Susan Wood as Girl at Party
- Marisa Joffrey as Girl at Party
- Catherine Scorsese as Mother
- Paul DeBonde as Boy in Fight
- Victor Mangotta as Boy in Fight
- Martin Scorsese appears in an uncredited role as a gangster

== Production ==
The first draft of the film was under the title Bring on the Dancing Girls. Scorsese shot footage in Little Italy of J.R. and his friends participating in "fights, drinking sessions, orgies", but Scorsese stated that it was "a disaster and everybody hated it". Haig P. Manoogian, his former professor, told him to write new scenes featuring the girl and expand upon J.R. inner conflict.

Who's That Knocking at My Door was filmed in New York City over the course of two years, undergoing many changes, new directions and different names along the way. The film began in 1965 by Scorsese as a student short film about J.R. and his do-nothing friends. In 1967, the romance plot with Zina Bethune was introduced and spliced together with the earlier film, and the title was changed to I Call First. Manoogian provided $5,000 (about $49,000 in 2024) in seed money before raising an additional $65,000 (about $634,000 in 2024) from independent investors.

== Release ==
The film received its world premiere at the Chicago International Film Festival in November 1967.

Scorsese was unable to find a distributor for the film and moved to Amsterdam, where he directed commercials with Richard Coll. Manoogian told Scorsese that Joseph Brenner, an exploitation distributor, wanted to distribute the film as a way to enter the mainstream industry. Brenner requested that a nude scene be added and Scorsese filmed one over the course of two days in Amsterdam with Keitel and Anne Collette. Max Fisher was the cinematographer for this scene as Coll was sick. Scorsese had to "smuggle" the footage back into the United States so that it could be edited into the movie. "I came back, kind of smuggled it back into the country in my raincoat, put it in the middle of the film and then the film was released." On the director's commentary of the DVD release, Scorsese says "I didn't declare it."

The film was re-issued in February 1970 by Medford Film Distribution under the title J.R. However, all subsequent releases have been published under the 1968 title.

== Reception ==
American critic Roger Ebert gave the film an extremely positive review after its world premiere at the Chicago International Film Festival in November 1967 (when it still went by the name I Call First). He called the film "a work that is absolutely genuine, artistically satisfying and technically comparable to the best films being made anywhere. I have no reservations in describing it as a great moment in American movies." Variety described the film as "more of a class exercise than a commercially sound film". The review later stated, "Scorsese occasionally brings the film to life, as in a weekend drive by J.R. and two buddies to an upstate village where the camera shows up their 'big city' shallowness in comparison to the townspeople. Generally, however, his script and direction lack any dramatic value and give far too much exposure to sexual fantasies on the part of the boy."

When the film received its theatrical release more than a year later, Ebert admitted that he had been perhaps too eager with his first review, admitting that "Scorsese was occasionally too obvious, and the film has serious structural flaws." However, he was still highly positive towards the film, and suggested that "It is possible that with more experience and maturity Scorsese will direct more polished, finished films." Vincent Canby of The New York Times acknowledged that Scorsese has "composed a fluid, technically proficient movie, more intense and sincere than most commercial releases." However, he felt Scorsese hadn't "succeeded in making a drama that is really much more aware than the characters themselves. The result is a movie that is as precise—and as small—as a contact print."

On Rotten Tomatoes the film holds an approval rating of 71% based on 24 reviews, with an average rating of 6/10. On Metacritic, the film has a weighted average score of 63 out of 100 based on nine critics, indicating "generally favorable reviews".

== See also ==
- List of American films of 1967
- List of hood films

== Works cited ==
- Wilson, Michael (2011). Scorsese On Scorsese. Cahiers du Cinéma. ISBN 9782866427023.
