= List of awards and nominations received by Martin Scorsese =

Martin Scorsese awards and nominations
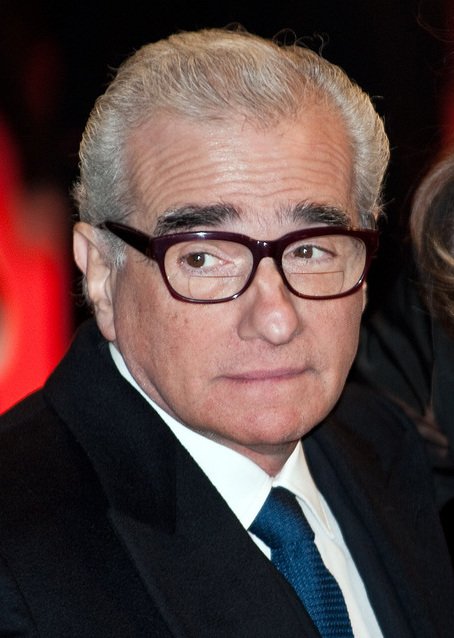
- Scorsese at the 2010 Berlin Film Festival
Awards and nominations
Award	Wins	Nominations
Academy Awards	1	16
BAFTA Awards	4	17
Emmy Awards	3	14
Golden Globe Awards	3	12
Grammy Awards	1	3

Totals (Note: Certain award groups do not simply award one winner. They acknowledge several different recipients, have runners-up, and have third place. Since this is a specific recognition and is different from losing an award, runner-up mentions are considered wins in this award tally. For simplification and to avoid errors, each award in this list has been presumed to have had a prior nomination.)
- Wins: 12
- Nominations: 61

Martin Scorsese is an American filmmaker who has received several awards over his six decade long career, including an Academy Award, four BAFTA Awards, three Emmy Awards, three Golden Globe Awards and a Grammy Award.

Chronicling his achievements in the film industry, the acclaimed filmmaker has received ten nominations for the Academy Award for Best Director, one more than Steven Spielberg, making him the most-nominated living director, second all-time only to William Wyler (12 nominations). He has won the Academy Award once, for the crime thriller The Departed (2006). Ten of Scorsese's films have been nominated for the Academy Award for Best Picture: the psychological drama Taxi Driver (1976), the sports drama Raging Bull (1980), the mobster film Goodfellas (1990), the drama Gangs of New York (2002), the historical epic The Aviator (2004), the crime thriller The Departed (2006), the children's adventure Hugo (2011), the crime comedy-drama The Wolf of Wall Street (2013), the mobster epic The Irishman (2019), and the western crime epic Killers of the Flower Moon (2023).

For his work on television, he won the Primetime Emmy Award for Outstanding Directing for a Drama Series for the HBO crime drama series Boardwalk Empire (2011) as well as Emmy Awards for Outstanding Documentary or Nonfiction Special and Outstanding Directing for a Documentary/Nonfiction Program for HBO documentary George Harrison: Living in the Material World (2012). He was Emmy-nominated for directing the documentaries, No Direction Home (2005) about Bob Dylan and A Letter to Elia (2011) about Elia Kazan as well as the Netflix docu-series Pretend It's a City (2021) starring Fran Lebowitz. He also produced the Blues doc The Soul of a Man (2004), and the Roger Ebert doc Life Itself (2014).

Scorsese has earned top awards in film (Academy Award), music (Grammy Award), and television (Primetime Emmy Award). He also won the Cannes Film Festival's Palme d'Or for Taxi Driver and a Best Director Award for After Hours as well as the Venice International Film Festival's Silver Lion for Goodfellas. He has received numerous honorary awards including the BFI Fellowship in 1995, a Career Golden Lion in 1995, the AFI Life Achievement Award in 1997, the Honorary César in 2000, the Kennedy Center Honors in 2007, the Golden Globe Cecil B. DeMille Award in 2010, the BAFTA Fellowship in 2012, as well as the Honorary Golden Bear and the David O. Selznick Achievement Award both in 2024.

== Major awards ==
=== Academy Awards ===
Year	Category	Nominated work	Result	Ref.
1981	Best Director	Raging Bull	Nominated	
1989	Best Director	The Last Temptation of Christ	Nominated	
1991	Best Director	Goodfellas	Nominated	
1991	Best Adapted Screenplay	Goodfellas	Nominated	
1994	Best Adapted Screenplay	The Age of Innocence	Nominated	
2003	Best Director	Gangs of New York	Nominated	
2005	Best Director	The Aviator	Nominated	
2007	Best Director	The Departed	Won	
2012	Best Picture	Hugo	Nominated	
2012	Best Director	Hugo	Nominated	
2014	Best Picture	The Wolf of Wall Street	Nominated	
2014	Best Director	The Wolf of Wall Street	Nominated	
2020	Best Picture	The Irishman	Nominated	
2020	Best Director	The Irishman	Nominated	
2024	Best Picture	Killers of the Flower Moon	Nominated	
2024	Best Director	Killers of the Flower Moon	Nominated	

=== BAFTA Awards ===
Year	Category	Nominated work	Result	Ref.
British Academy Film Awards
1976	Best Film	Alice Doesn't Live Here Anymore	Won	
1976	Best Direction	Alice Doesn't Live Here Anymore	Nominated	
1977	Best Direction	Taxi Driver	Nominated	
1984	Best Direction	The King of Comedy	Nominated	
1991	Best Film	Goodfellas	Won	
1991	Best Direction	Goodfellas	Won	
1991	Best Adapted Screenplay	Goodfellas	Won	
2003	Best Direction	Gangs of New York	Nominated	
2005	Best Direction	The Aviator	Nominated	
2007	Best Direction	The Departed	Nominated	
2012	Best Documentary	George Harrison: Living in the Material World	Nominated	
2012	Best Direction	Hugo	Nominated	
2014	Best Direction	The Wolf of Wall Street	Nominated	
2020	Best Film	The Irishman	Nominated	
2020	Best Direction	The Irishman	Nominated	
2024	Best Film	Killers of the Flower Moon	Nominated	
2026	Outstanding British Film	Die My Love	Nominated	

=== Emmy Awards ===
Year	Category	Nominated work	Result	Ref.
Primetime Emmy Awards
1995	Outstanding Cultural Program	Eric Clapton: Nothing But the Blues	Nominated	
2004	Outstanding Picture Editing for Variety Programming	AFI Life Achievement Award: A Tribute to Robert De Niro	Nominated	
2004	Outstanding Documentary or Nonfiction Series	The Soul of a Man	Nominated	
2006	Outstanding Documentary or Nonfiction Series	American Masters	Nominated	
2006	Outstanding Directing for Nonfiction Programming	No Direction Home	Nominated	
2011	Outstanding Directing for Nonfiction Programming	A Letter to Elia	Nominated	
2011	Outstanding Drama Series	Boardwalk Empire (season one)	Nominated	
2011	Outstanding Directing for a Drama Series	Boardwalk Empire (episode: "Boardwalk Empire")	Won	
2012	Outstanding Drama Series	Boardwalk Empire (season two)	Nominated	
2012	Outstanding Documentary or Nonfiction Special	George Harrison: Living in the Material World	Won	
2012	Outstanding Directing for Nonfiction Programming	George Harrison: Living in the Material World	Won	
2021	Outstanding Documentary or Nonfiction Series	Pretend It's a City	Nominated	
2025	Outstanding Guest Actor in a Comedy Series	The Studio (episode: "The Promotion")	Nominated	
News and Documentary Emmy Awards
2014	Best Documentary	Life Itself	Nominated	

=== Golden Globe Awards ===
Year	Category	Nominated work	Result	Ref.
1981	Best Director – Motion Picture	Raging Bull	Nominated	
1991	Best Director – Motion Picture	Goodfellas	Nominated	
1991	Best Screenplay – Motion Picture	Goodfellas	Nominated	
1994	Best Director – Motion Picture	The Age of Innocence	Nominated	
1996	Best Director – Motion Picture	Casino	Nominated	
2003	Best Director – Motion Picture	Gangs of New York	Won	
2005	Best Director – Motion Picture	The Aviator	Nominated	
2007	Best Director – Motion Picture	The Departed	Won	
2012	Best Director – Motion Picture	Hugo	Won	
2020	Best Director – Motion Picture	The Irishman	Nominated	
2024	Best Director – Motion Picture	Killers of the Flower Moon	Nominated	
2024	Best Screenplay – Motion Picture	Killers of the Flower Moon	Nominated	

=== Grammy Awards ===
Year	Category	Nominated work	Result	Ref.
2004	Best Compilation Soundtrack for Visual Media	Gangs of New York	Nominated	
2005	Best Music Film	Martin Scorsese Presents the Blues: A Musical Journey	Nominated	
2006	Best Music Film	No Direction Home	Won	

== Miscellaneous awards ==
Organizations	Year	Category	Work	Result	Ref.
Berlin International Film Festival	1991	Golden Bear	Cape Fear	Nominated	
Berlin International Film Festival	2024	Honorary Golden Bear		Recipient	
Cannes Film Festival	1974	Palme d'Or	Alice Doesn't Live Here Anymore	Nominated	
Cannes Film Festival	1976	Palme d'Or	Taxi Driver	Won	
Cannes Film Festival	1983	Palme d'Or	The King of Comedy	Nominated	
Cannes Film Festival	1986	Palme d'Or	After Hours	Nominated	
Cannes Film Festival	1986	Best Director	After Hours	Won	
Cannes Film Festival	2018	Carosse d'Or		Recipient	
Capri Hollywood International Film Festival	2023	Capri Producer Award (Note: Shared with Bradley Cooper, Steven Spielberg, Fred Berner, Amy Durning and Kristie Macosko Krieger)	Maestro	Won	
Capri Hollywood International Film Festival	2019	Best Picture	The Irishman	Won	
César Awards	1986	Best Foreign Film	After Hours	Nominated	
César Awards	1990	Best Foreign Film	Goodfellas	Nominated	
César Awards	1999	Honorary César		Recipient	
César Awards	2002	Best Foreign Film	Gangs of New York	Nominated	
Critics' Choice Movie Awards	2002	Best Director	Gangs of New York	Nominated	
Critics' Choice Movie Awards	2004	Best Director	The Aviator	Won	
Critics' Choice Movie Awards	2006	Best Director	The Departed	Won	
Critics' Choice Movie Awards	2011	Best Director	Hugo	Nominated	
Critics' Choice Movie Awards	2012	Best Documentary Feature	George Harrison: Living in the Material World	Won	
Critics' Choice Movie Awards	2013	Best Director	The Wolf of Wall Street	Nominated	
Critics' Choice Movie Awards	2019	Best Director	The Irishman	Nominated	
Critics' Choice Movie Awards	2023	Best Director	Killers of the Flower Moon	Nominated	
Critics' Choice Movie Awards	2023	Best Adapted Screenplay	Killers of the Flower Moon	Nominated	
Directors Guild of America Awards	1976	Outstanding Directing – Feature Film	Taxi Driver	Nominated	
Directors Guild of America Awards	1980	Outstanding Directing – Feature Film	Raging Bull	Nominated	
Directors Guild of America Awards	1990	Outstanding Directing – Feature Film	Goodfellas	Nominated	
Directors Guild of America Awards	1993	Outstanding Directing – Feature Film	The Age of Innocence	Nominated	
Directors Guild of America Awards	2002	Outstanding Directing – Feature Film	Gangs of New York	Nominated	
Directors Guild of America Awards	2004	Outstanding Directing – Feature Film	The Aviator	Nominated	
Directors Guild of America Awards	2006	Outstanding Directing – Feature Film	The Departed	Won	
Directors Guild of America Awards	2010	Outstanding Directing – Drama Series	Boardwalk Empire (episode: "Boardwalk Empire")	Won	
Directors Guild of America Awards	2011	Outstanding Directing – Documentaries	George Harrison: Living in the Material World	Nominated	
Directors Guild of America Awards	2011	Outstanding Directing – Feature Film	Hugo	Nominated	
Directors Guild of America Awards	2013	Outstanding Directing – Feature Film	The Wolf of Wall Street	Nominated	
Directors Guild of America Awards	2019	Outstanding Directing – Feature Film	The Irishman	Nominated	
Directors Guild of America Awards	2023	Outstanding Directing – Feature Film	Killers of the Flower Moon	Nominated	
Gotham Awards	2010	Best Documentary	Public Speaking	Nominated	
Independent Spirit Awards	1985	Best Director	After Hours	Won	
Independent Spirit Awards	1990	Best Feature	The Grifters	Won	
Melbourne International Film Festival	2000	Best Documentary	My Voyage to Italy	Won	
National Board of Review	2000	William K. Everson Film History Award	My Voyage to Italy	Won	
National Society of Film Critics Awards	2000	Special Award	My Voyage to Italy	Won	
Producers Guild of America Awards	2011	Outstanding Producer of Episodic Television, Drama	Boardwalk Empire	Won	
Producers Guild of America Awards	2011	Outstanding Producer of Theatrical Motion Pictures	Hugo	Nominated	
Producers Guild of America Awards	2019	Outstanding Producer of Theatrical Motion Pictures	The Irishman	Nominated	
Producers Guild of America Awards	2024	David O. Selznick Achievement Award		Recipient	
Santa Barbara International Film Festival	2024	Outstanding Directors of the Year	Killers of the Flower Moon	Won	
Satellite Award	2000	Best Documentary Film	My Voyage to Italy	Nominated	
Venice International Film Festival	1988	Bastone Bianco Award	The Last Temptation of Christ	Won	
Venice International Film Festival	1990	Golden Lion	Goodfellas	Nominated	
Venice International Film Festival	1990	Silver Lion	Goodfellas	Won	
Venice International Film Festival	1990	Audience Award	Goodfellas	Won	
Venice International Film Festival	1990	Bastone Bianco Award	Goodfellas	Won	
Venice International Film Festival	1993	Elvira Notari Award	The Age of Innocence	Won	
Venice International Film Festival	1995	Career Golden Lion		Recipient	
Writers Guild of America Award	1973	Best Drama Written for the Screen	Mean Streets	Nominated	
Writers Guild of America Award	1990	Best Adapted Screenplay	Goodfellas	Nominated	
Writers Guild of America Award	2002	Evelyn F. Burkey Award		Received	
Writers Guild of America Award	2024	Best Adapted Screenplay	Killers of the Flower Moon	Nominated	
Cinema for Peace	2025	Dove for The Most Valuable Film of The Year	Killers of The Flower Moon	Nominated	

== Honorary awards ==
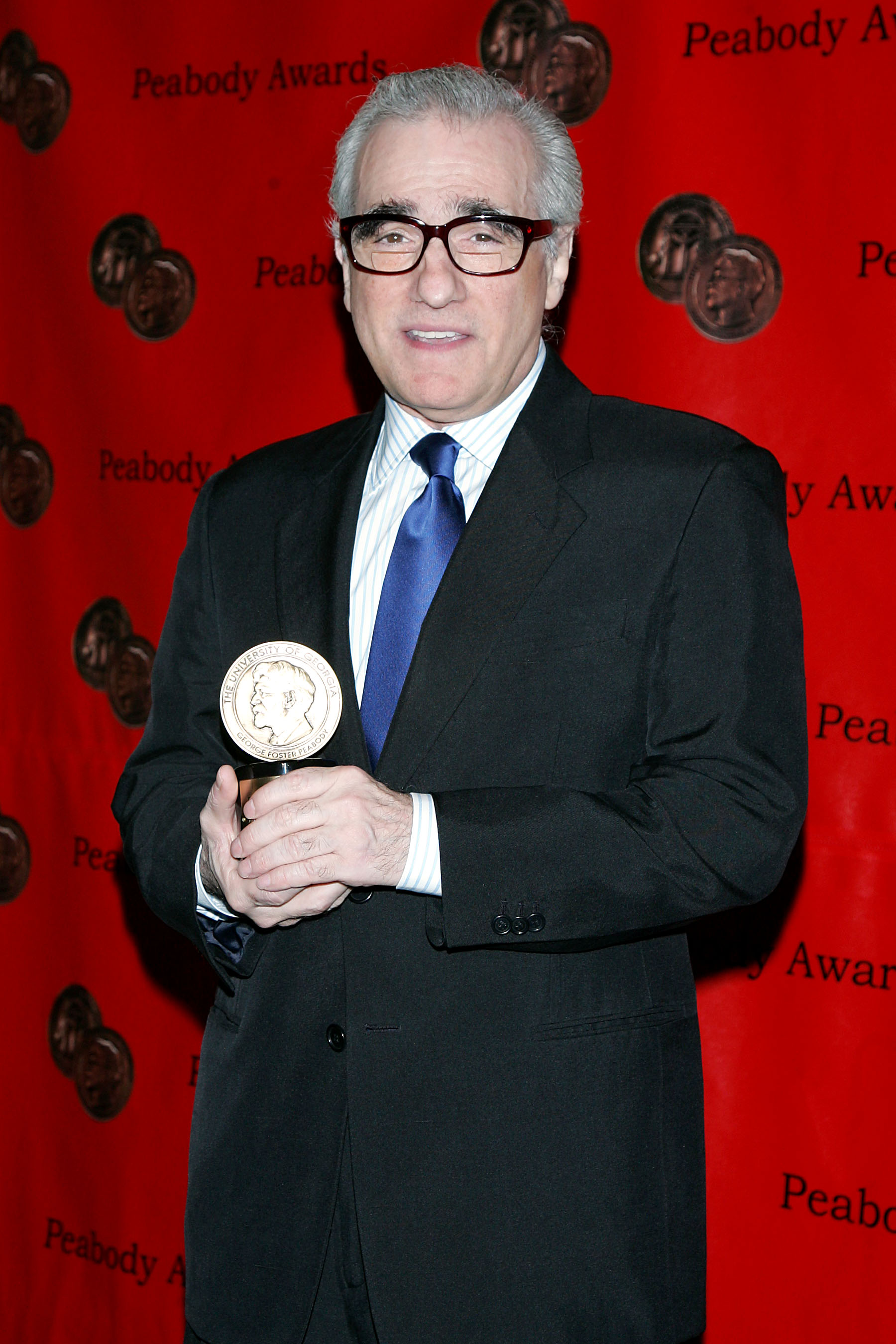
Scorsese at the 65th Annual Peabody Awards

Organizations	Year	Award	Result	Ref.
Britannia Award	1993	Excellence in Film	Honored	
British Film Institute	1995	BFI Fellowship	Honored	
Venice International Film Festival	1995	Career Golden Lion	Honored	
American Film Institute	1997	AFI Life Achievement Award	Honored	
Film Society at Lincoln Center	1998	Chaplin Gala Tribute	Honored	
César Awards	2000	Honorary César	Honored	
Directors Guild of America	2003	Lifetime Achievement Award	Honored	
Hollywood Walk of Fame	2003	Motion Picture Star	Honored	
Kennedy Center Honors	2007	Medal and inductee	Honored	
Golden Globe Awards	2010	Cecil B. DeMille Award	Honored	
British Academy Film Awards	2012	BAFTA Fellowship	Honored	
The Imperial Family of Japan The Japan Art Association	2016	Praemium Imperiale	Honored	
Visual Effects Society	2020	Lifetime Achievement Award	Honored	
Santa Barbara International Film Festival	2020	Kirk Douglas Award	Honored	
International Film Festival of India	2021	Satyajit Ray Lifetime Achievement Award	Honored	
Berlin International Film Festival	2024	Honorary Golden Bear	Honored	
Producers Guild of America	2024	David O. Selznick Achievement Award	Honored	

== Actors' awarded performances ==
Under Scorsese's direction, actors have continually received nominations from the major competitive acting awards (the Academy Award, the BAFTA Award, and the Golden Globe Award). 28 actors have received nominations, including actors such as Robert De Niro, Paul Newman, Jack Nicholson, Daniel Day-Lewis, Jodie Foster, Barbara Hershey, Ellen Burstyn, and Miriam Margolyes. 13 actors received awards, including Ellen Burstyn, Diane Ladd, Jodie Foster, Robert De Niro, Paul Newman, Joe Pesci, Winona Ryder, Miriam Margolyes, Sharon Stone, Daniel Day-Lewis, Cate Blanchett, and Leonardo DiCaprio.

Academy Awards

Year	Performer	Film	Result
Academy Award for Best Actor
1976	Robert De Niro	Taxi Driver	Nominated
1980	Robert De Niro	Raging Bull	Won
1986	Paul Newman	The Color of Money	Won
1991	Robert De Niro	Cape Fear	Nominated
2002	Daniel Day-Lewis	Gangs of New York	Nominated
2004	Leonardo DiCaprio	The Aviator	Nominated
2013	Leonardo DiCaprio	The Wolf of Wall Street	Nominated
Academy Award for Best Actress
1974	Ellen Burstyn	Alice Doesn't Live Here Anymore	Won
1995	Sharon Stone	Casino	Nominated
2023	Lily Gladstone	Killers of the Flower Moon	Nominated
Academy Award for Best Supporting Actor
1980	Joe Pesci	Raging Bull	Nominated
1990	Joe Pesci	Goodfellas	Won
2004	Alan Alda	The Aviator	Nominated
2006	Mark Wahlberg	The Departed	Nominated
2013	Jonah Hill	The Wolf of Wall Street	Nominated
2019	Al Pacino	The Irishman	Nominated
2019	Joe Pesci	The Irishman	Nominated
2023	Robert De Niro	Killers of the Flower Moon	Nominated
Academy Award for Best Supporting Actress
1974	Diane Ladd	Alice Doesn't Live Here Anymore	Nominated
1976	Jodie Foster	Taxi Driver	Nominated
1980	Cathy Moriarty	Raging Bull	Nominated
1986	Mary Elizabeth Mastrantonio	The Color of Money	Nominated
1990	Lorraine Bracco	Goodfellas	Nominated
1991	Juliette Lewis	Cape Fear	Nominated
1993	Winona Ryder	The Age of Innocence	Nominated
2004	Cate Blanchett	The Aviator	Won
