= Martin Scorsese =

American filmmaker (born 1942)

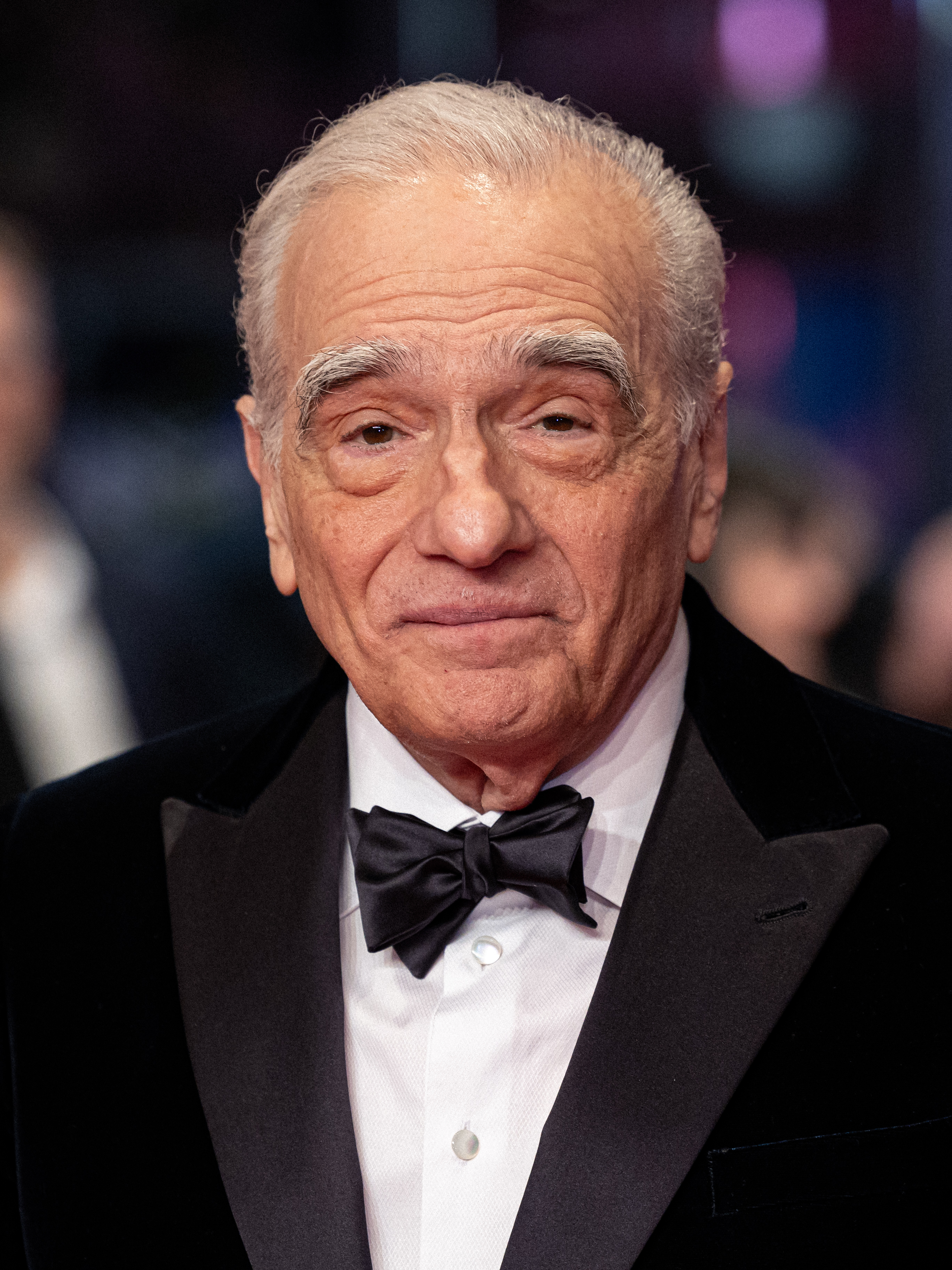
- Scorsese at the Berlinale in 2024
- Born: Martin Charles Scorsese; November 17, 1942 (age 84); New York City, U.S.
- Citizenship: United States; Italy
- Education: New York University (BA, MA)
- Occupations: Director; producer; screenwriter; actor
- Years active: 1962–present
- Works: Filmography; unrealized projects; De Niro collaborations; DiCaprio collaborations
- Spouses: Laraine Marie Brennan (m. 1965; div. 1971); Julia Cameron (m. 1976; div. 1977); Isabella Rossellini (m. 1979; div. 1982); Barbara De Fina (m. 1985; div. 1991); Helen Schermerhorn Morris (m. 1999)
- Partner: Illeana Douglas (1989–1997)
- Children: 3, including Domenica and Francesca
- Parents: Charles Scorsese (father); Catherine Scorsese (mother)
- Awards: Full list

Signature
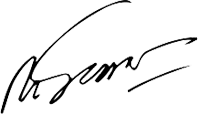

Martin Charles Scorsese (/skɔːrˈsɛsi/ skor-SESS-ee; Italian: [skorˈseːze, -se]; born November 17, 1942) is an American filmmaker. One of the major figures of the New Hollywood era, he is widely considered one of the greatest and most influential directors in the history of cinema. He has received numerous accolades including an Academy Award, four British Academy Film Awards, three Emmy Awards, a Grammy Award, and three Golden Globes. Scorsese has also been honored with the AFI Life Achievement Award in 1997, the Film Society of Lincoln Center tribute in 1998, the Kennedy Center Honor in 2007, the Golden Globe Cecil B. DeMille Award in 2010, and the BAFTA Fellowship in 2012. Five of his films have been inducted into the National Film Registry by the Library of Congress as "culturally, historically or aesthetically significant".

Scorsese received a Master of Arts degree from New York University in 1968. His directorial debut, Who's That Knocking at My Door (1967), was accepted into the Chicago International Film Festival. In the 1970s and 1980s, Scorsese's films, much influenced by his Italian-American background and upbringing in New York City, centered on macho-posturing men and explore crime, machismo, nihilism and Catholic concepts of guilt and redemption. His trademark styles of extensive use of slow motion and freeze frames, voice-over narration, graphic depictions of extreme violence, liberal use of profanity and collaboration with Robert De Niro were first shown in Mean Streets (1973).

Scorsese continued his association with De Niro directing him in nine more films, including Taxi Driver (1976), New York, New York (1977), Raging Bull (1980), The King of Comedy (1982), Goodfellas (1990), Cape Fear (1991), Casino (1995), and The Irishman (2019). In the following decades, he also garnered box office success with a series of six collaborations with Leonardo DiCaprio, including Gangs of New York (2002), The Aviator (2004), The Departed (2006)—which won him the Academy Award for Best Director—Shutter Island (2010), and The Wolf of Wall Street (2013). He worked with both De Niro and DiCaprio on Killers of the Flower Moon (2023). He also directed After Hours (1985), The Color of Money (1986), The Last Temptation of Christ (1988), The Age of Innocence (1993), Kundun (1997), Hugo (2011), and Silence (2016).

In television, Scorsese has directed episodes for the HBO series Boardwalk Empire (2010–2014) and Vinyl (2016), as well as the HBO documentary Public Speaking (2010) and the Netflix docu-series Pretend It's a City (2021). He has also made several documentaries focusing on rock music such as The Last Waltz (1978), No Direction Home (2005), and Shine a Light (2008) as well as film history with A Personal Journey with Martin Scorsese Through American Movies (1995) and My Voyage to Italy (1999). An advocate for film preservation and restoration, he has founded three nonprofit organizations including The Film Foundation in 1990. His life was profiled in the Apple TV+ docuseries Mr. Scorsese (2025).

== Early life and education ==
Martin Charles Scorsese was born in the Flushing neighborhood of New York City's Queens borough on November 17, 1942. He grew up in the Little Italy neighborhood of the city's Manhattan borough. Both of his parents, Catherine Scorsese (née Cappa) and Charles Scorsese, worked in the Garment District. Charles was a clothes presser, while Catherine was a machinist. All four of Scorsese's grandparents were Italian immigrants from Sicily, hailing from Polizzi Generosa on his father's side and Ciminna on his mother's side. The original surname of the family was Scozzese, meaning "Scot" or "Scottish" in Italian, and was changed to Scorsese because of a transcription error.

Scorsese was raised in a predominantly Catholic environment. As a boy, he had asthma and could not play sports or take part in any activities with other children, so his parents and his older brother would often take him to movie theaters; it was at this stage in his life that he developed a passion for cinema. He has spoken of the influence on him of Powell and Pressburger's Black Narcissus (1947) and The Red Shoes (1948). As a teenager living in Brooklyn, he frequently commuted to the Bronx to rent Powell and Pressburger's film, The Tales of Hoffmann (1951), from a store which had only one copy of the reel. He was one of only two people who regularly rented it; the other, George A. Romero, who then lived in that borough, also became a director.

Scorsese has named Sabu and Victor Mature as his favorite actors in his youth. He recalls his father taking him to see Jean Renoir's The River (1951) and being fascinated by its depiction of India. He became "obsessed" with Renoir's La Grande Illusion (1937) when it was rereleased. He names John Ford's The Quiet Man (1952) and The Searchers (1956) as formative influences. In a documentary on Italian neorealism, he commented on how Roberto Rossellini's Rome, Open City (1945) and Vittorio De Sica's Bicycle Thieves (1946) inspired him and influenced his view of his Sicilian roots. In his documentary Il Mio Viaggio in Italia (My Voyage to Italy), Scorsese noted that the Sicilian episode of Rossellini's Paisà (1946), which he first saw on television with his relatives who were themselves Sicilian immigrants, had a significant impact on his life. He remembers responding "very strongly" to Alfred Hitchcock's Vertigo (1958). He acknowledges owing a great debt to the French New Wave and has stated that "the French New Wave has influenced all filmmakers who have worked since, whether they saw the films or not." He has also cited the works of Satyajit Ray, Ingmar Bergman, Andrzej Wajda, Michelangelo Antonioni, Federico Fellini, Ishirō Honda and Eiji Tsuburaya as major influences on his career. Although there was no habit of reading at home, towards the end of the 1950s, Scorsese began to approach literature, being marked in particular by Fyodor Dostoevsky's Notes from Underground (1864), James Joyce's A Portrait of the Artist as a Young Man (1916) and Graham Greene's The Heart of the Matter (1948).

Scorsese attended the all-boys Cardinal Hayes High School in the Bronx, graduating in 1960. He had initially desired to become a priest, attending a preparatory seminary, but failed after the first year and was unable to attend Fordham University. This gave way to cinema and consequently Scorsese enrolled in New York University's Washington Square College (now known as the College of Arts and Science), where he earned a bachelor's degree in English in 1964. He went on to earn his Master of Arts from NYU's School of Education (now the Steinhardt School of Culture, Education, and Human Development) in 1968, a year after the school was founded.

== Career ==
=== 1963–1972: Short films and feature debut ===
While attending the Tisch School of the Arts, Scorsese made the short films What's a Nice Girl like You Doing in a Place like This? (1963) and It's Not Just You, Murray! (1964). His most famous short of the period is the darkly comic The Big Shave (1967), which features Peter Bernuth. The film is an indictment of America's involvement in Vietnam, suggested by its alternative title Viet '67. Scorsese has mentioned on several occasions that he was greatly inspired in his early days at New York University by Armenian-American film professor Haig P. Manoogian, calling his teachings "the most precious gift I have ever received". Scorsese's first professional job was when he was at NYU; he was the assistant cameraman to cinematographer Baird Bryant on the John G. Avildsen directed short film Smiles (1964). Scorsese stated: "It was really important because they were filming on 35mm". He stated he was terrible at the job because he could not judge the distance of the focus. He also worked as a gaffer for Albert and David Maysles and as an editor for CBS News, the latter of whom offered him a full time position, but Scorsese declined due to his pursuit in film.

In 1967, Scorsese made his first feature-length film, the black and white I Call First, later retitled Who's That Knocking at My Door, with his fellow students actor Harvey Keitel and editor Thelma Schoonmaker, both of whom were to become long-term collaborators. Roger Ebert saw the film at the 1967 Chicago International Film Festival and wrote, in Scorsese's first published review: "it brings together two opposing worlds of American cinema. On the one hand, there have been traditional films like Marty, View from the Bridge, On the Waterfront and David and Lisa -- all sincere attempts to function at the level where real lives are led and all suffering to some degree from their makers' romantic and idealistic ideas, about such lives. On the other hand, there have been experimental films from Jonas Mekas, Shirley Clarke and other pioneers of the New York underground. In The Connection, Shadows and Guns of the Trees, they used improvised dialog and scenes and hidden and hand-held cameras in an attempt to capture the freshness of a spontaneous experience ... I Call First brings these two kinds of films together into a work that is absolutely genuine, artistically satisfying and technically comparable to the best films being made anywhere. I have no reservations in describing it as a great moment in American movies."

Scorsese became friends with the influential "movie brats" of the 1970s: Brian De Palma, Francis Ford Coppola, George Lucas and Steven Spielberg. It was De Palma who introduced Scorsese to Robert De Niro. During this period, Scorsese worked as the assistant director and one of the editors on Michael Wadleigh's documentary Woodstock (1970) and met actor–director John Cassavetes, who became a close friend and mentor.

Scorsese met Roger Corman after coming to Hollywood to edit Medicine Ball Caravan and Corman, who had seen and liked Who's That Knocking at My Door, asked Scorsese to make a sequel to Bloody Mama (1970). This came to be Boxcar Bertha (1972). It was Corman who taught Scorsese that entertaining films could be shot with very little money or time, preparing the young director well for the challenges to come. Following the film's release, Cassavetes encouraged Scorsese to make the films that he wanted to make, rather than someone else's projects.

=== 1973–1989: Breakthrough and acclaim ===
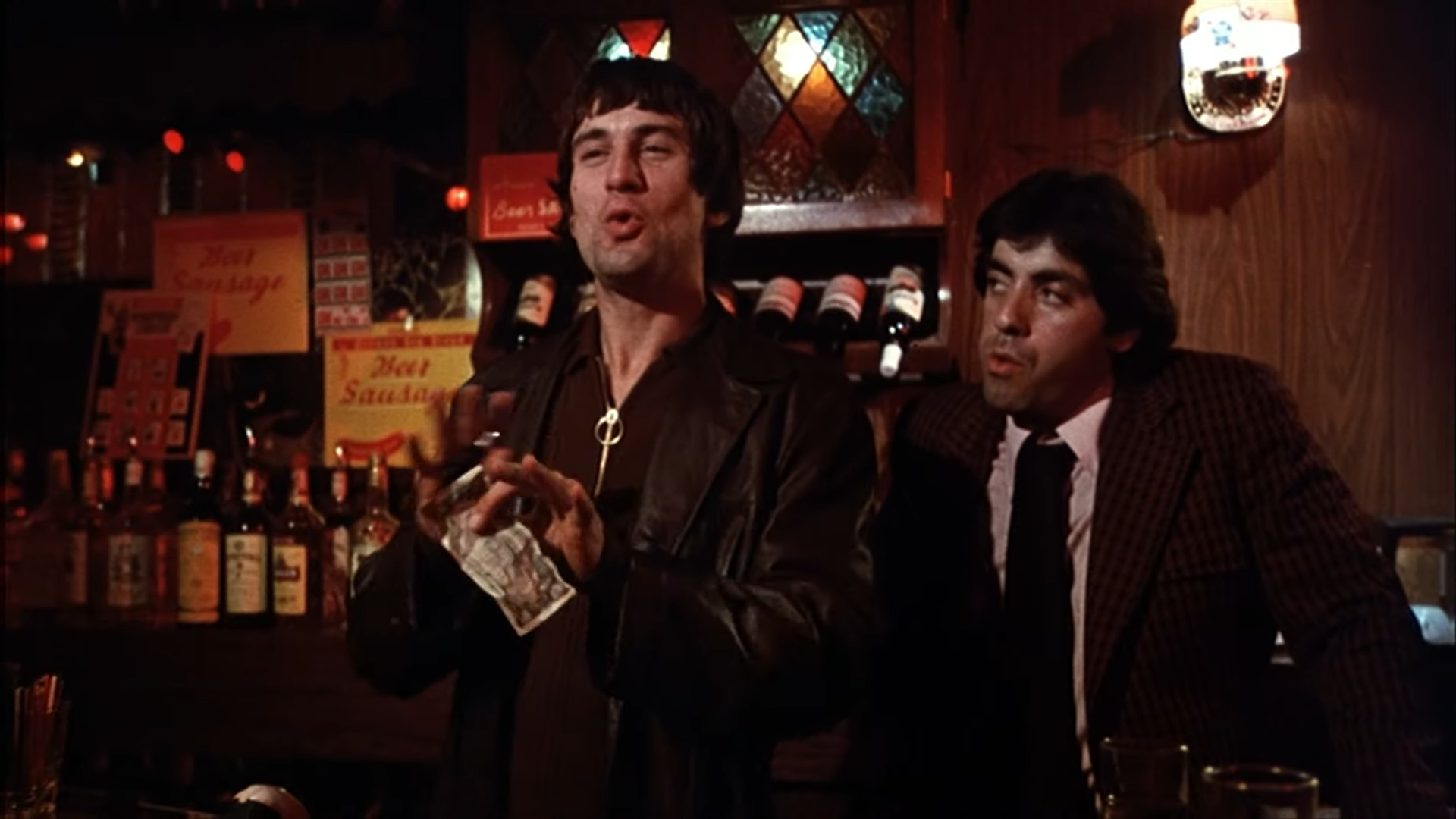
Robert De Niro acted in his first collaboration with Scorsese in the crime drama Mean Streets (1973).

Mean Streets was a breakthrough for Scorsese, Keitel and Robert De Niro. Pauline Kael wrote: "Martin Scorsese's Mean Streets is a true original of our time, a triumph of personal filmmaking. It has its own hallucinatory look; the characters live in the darkness of bars, with lighting and color just this shade of lurid ... It's about American life here and now, and it doesn't look like an American movie, or feel like one. If it were subtitled, we could hail a new European or South American talent — a new Buñuel steeped in Verdi, perhaps." By now the signature Scorsese style was in place: macho posturing, bloody violence, Catholic guilt and redemption, gritty New York locale (though the majority of Mean Streets was shot in Los Angeles), rapid-fire editing, and a soundtrack with contemporary music. Although the film was innovative, its wired atmosphere, edgy documentary style, and gritty street-level direction owed a debt to Cassavetes, Samuel Fuller and early Jean-Luc Godard. In 1974, actress Ellen Burstyn chose Scorsese to direct her in Alice Doesn't Live Here Anymore, for which she won an Academy Award for Best Actress. Although well regarded, the film remains an anomaly in Scorsese's early career as it focuses on a central female character. Returning to Little Italy to explore his ethnic roots, Scorsese directed Italianamerican (1974), a documentary featuring his parents Charles and Catherine Scorsese.

Scorsese followed with Taxi Driver in 1976, which depicted a Vietnam veteran who takes the law into his own hands on New York's crime-ridden streets. The film established him as an accomplished filmmaker and also brought attention to cinematographer Michael Chapman, whose style tends towards high contrasts, strong colors, and complex camera movements. The film starred De Niro as the angry and alienated Travis Bickle, and co-starred Jodie Foster in a highly controversial role as an underage prostitute, with Harvey Keitel as her pimp. Taxi Driver also marked the start of a series of collaborations between Scorsese and writer Paul Schrader, whose influences included the diary of would-be assassin Arthur Bremer, John Ford's The Searchers (1956), and Robert Bresson's Pickpocket (1959). Already controversial upon its release, Taxi Driver hit the headlines again five years later, when John Hinckley Jr. made an assassination attempt on then-president Ronald Reagan. He subsequently blamed his act on his obsession with Jodie Foster's Taxi Driver character (in the film, De Niro's character, Travis Bickle, makes an assassination attempt on a senator).

Taxi Driver won the Palme d'Or at the 1976 Cannes Film Festival, also receiving four Oscar nominations, including Best Picture. The critical and financial success of Taxi Driver encouraged Scorsese to move ahead with his first big-budget project: the highly stylized musical New York, New York. This tribute to Scorsese's home town and the classic Hollywood musical was a box-office failure. The film was the director's third collaboration with De Niro, co-starring with Liza Minnelli. The film is best remembered today for the title theme song, which was popularized by Frank Sinatra. Although possessing Scorsese's usual visual panache and stylistic bravura, many critics felt its enclosed studio-bound atmosphere left it leaden in comparison with his earlier work. Despite its weak reception, the film is regarded positively by some critics. Richard Brody wrote:

For Scorsese, a lifelong cinephile, the essence of New York could be found in its depiction in classic Hollywood movies. Remarkably, his backward-looking tribute to the golden age of musicals and noirish romantic melodramas turned out to be one of his most freewheeling and personal films.

In 1977, he directed the Broadway musical The Act, starring Minnelli. The disappointing reception of New York, New York drove Scorsese into depression. By this stage Scorsese had developed a serious cocaine addiction. However, he did find the creative drive to make the highly regarded The Last Waltz, documenting the final concert by The Band. It was held at the Winterland Ballroom in San Francisco on Thanksgiving Day, 1976, and featured one of the most extensive lineups of prominent guest performers at a single concert, including Bob Dylan, Neil Young, Ringo Starr, Muddy Waters, Joni Mitchell, Van Morrison, Paul Butterfield, Neil Diamond, Ronnie Wood and Eric Clapton. However, Scorsese's commitments to other projects delayed the release of the film until 1978. Another Scorsese-directed documentary, titled American Boy, also appeared in 1978, focusing on Steven Prince, Scorcese's personal assistant who had a small cameo as a cocky gun salesman in Taxi Driver. A period of wild partying followed, damaging Scorsese's already fragile health. Scorsese helped provide footage for the documentary Elvis on Tour.

By several accounts (Scorsese's included), De Niro saved Scorsese's life when he persuaded him to kick his cocaine addiction to make his highly regarded film Raging Bull. Mark Singer summarized Scorsese's condition:

He (Scorsese) was more than mildly depressed. Drug abuse, and abuse of his body in general, culminated in a terrifying episode of internal bleeding. Robert De Niro came to see him in the hospital and asked, in so many words, whether he wanted to live or die. If you want to live, De Niro proposed, let's make this picture—referring to Raging Bull, an as-told-to book by Jake LaMotta, the former world middleweight boxing champion, that De Niro had given him to read years earlier.

Convinced that he would never make another movie, he poured his energies into making the violent biopic of middleweight boxing champion Jake LaMotta, calling it a kamikaze method of film-making. The film is widely viewed as a masterpiece and was voted the greatest film of the 1980s by Britain's Sight & Sound magazine. The film was dedicated to Armenian-American NYU film professor Haig P. Manoogian, "with love and resolution". It received eight Oscar nominations, including Best Picture, Best Actor for De Niro, Best Supporting Actress for Cathy Moriarty, Best Supporting Actor for Joe Pesci and Scorsese's first for Best Director. De Niro won, as did Thelma Schoonmaker for editing, but Best Director went to first-time director Robert Redford for Ordinary People. From this work onwards, Scorsese's films are always labeled as "A Martin Scorsese Picture" on promotional material. Raging Bull, filmed in high contrast black and white, is where Scorsese's style reached its zenith: Taxi Driver and New York, New York had used elements of expressionism to replicate psychological points of view, but here the style was taken to new extremes, employing extensive slow-motion, complex tracking shots, and extravagant distortion of perspective (for example, the size of boxing rings would change from fight to fight). Thematically too, the concerns carried on from Mean Streets and Taxi Driver: insecure males, violence, guilt, and redemption.

Although the screenplay for Raging Bull was credited to Paul Schrader and Mardik Martin (an Armenian-American screenwriter who earlier co-wrote Mean Streets), the finished script differed extensively from Schrader's original draft. It was rewritten several times by various writers including Jay Cocks. The final draft was largely written by Scorsese and De Niro. In 1997, the American Film Institute ranked Raging Bull as the twenty-fourth greatest American film of all time on their AFI's 100 Years ... 100 Movies list. In 2007, they ranked Raging Bull as the fourth American greatest film on their AFI's 100 Years ... 100 Movies (10th Anniversary Edition) list.

Scorsese's next project was his fifth collaboration with De Niro, The King of Comedy (1982). It is a satire on the world of media and celebrity, whose central character is a troubled loner who ironically becomes famous through a criminal act (kidnapping). The film was an obvious departure from the more emotionally committed films he had become associated with. Visually, it was far less kinetic than the style Scorsese had developed previously, often using a static camera and long takes. Here the expressionism of his previous work gave way to moments of almost total surrealism. It still bore many of Scorsese's trademarks, however. The King of Comedy failed at the box office, but has become increasingly well regarded by critics in the years since its release. German director Wim Wenders numbered it among his 15 favorite films. In 1983, Scorsese made a brief cameo appearance in Anna Pavlova (also known as A Woman for All Time), originally intended to be directed by one of his heroes, Michael Powell. This led to a more significant acting appearance in Bertrand Tavernier's jazz film Round Midnight. He also made a brief venture into television, directing an episode of Steven Spielberg's Amazing Stories.

With After Hours (1985), for which he won a Best Director Award at Cannes, Scorsese made an esthetic shift back to a pared-down, almost "underground" film-making style. Filmed on an extremely low budget, on location, and at night in the SoHo neighborhood of Manhattan, the film is a black comedy about one increasingly misfortunate night for a mild New York word processor (Griffin Dunne) and features cameos by such disparate actors as Teri Garr and Cheech & Chong. Along with the 1987 Michael Jackson music video "Bad", in 1986 Scorsese made The Color of Money, a sequel to Robert Rossen's The Hustler (1961) with Paul Newman, which co-starred Tom Cruise. Although adhering to Scorsese's established style, The Color of Money was Scorsese's first official foray into mainstream film-making. The film finally won Newman an Oscar and gave Scorsese the clout to finally secure backing for a project that had been a longtime goal for him: The Last Temptation of Christ.

In 1983, Scorsese began work on this long-cherished personal project. The Last Temptation of Christ, based on the 1955 novel by Nikos Kazantzakis, retold the life of Christ in human rather than divine terms. Barbara Hershey recalls introducing Scorsese to the book while they were filming Boxcar Bertha. The film was slated to shoot under the Paramount Pictures banner, but shortly before principal photography was to start, Paramount pulled the plug on the project, citing pressure from religious groups. In this aborted 1983 version, Aidan Quinn was cast as Jesus, and Sting was cast as Pontius Pilate. (In the 1988 version, these roles were played by Willem Dafoe and David Bowie respectively.) However, following his mid-1980s flirtation with commercial Hollywood, Scorsese made a major return to personal filmmaking with the project; Universal Pictures agreed to finance the film as Scorsese agreed to make a more mainstream film for the studio in the future (it eventually resulted in Cape Fear). Even prior to its 1988 release, the film (adapted by Taxi Driver and Raging Bull veteran Paul Schrader) caused a massive furor, with worldwide protests against its perceived blasphemy effectively turning a low-budget independent film into a media sensation. Most of the controversy centered on the final passages of the film, which depicted Christ marrying and raising a family with Mary Magdalene in a Satan-induced hallucination while on the cross.

In 1986, Scorsese directed the 18-minute short film Bad featuring Michael Jackson and Wesley Snipes (in his film debut). The short also serves as a music video and was shot in the Hoyt–Schermerhorn Streets station in Brooklyn over a 6-week period during November and December 1986. Chapman was the film's cinematographer. The direction and choreography were heavily influenced by West Side Story (1961). Scorsese also noted the influence of Taxi Driver in Spike Lee's documentary Bad 25 (2012). The short has been praised by critics as one of the greatest and most iconic videos of all time. That year, he had signed a deal with upstart major The Walt Disney Studios to produce and direct features, following the success of The Color of Money.

Looking past the controversy, The Last Temptation of Christ gained critical acclaim and remains an important work in Scorsese's canon: an explicit attempt to wrestle with the spirituality underpinning his films up until that point. He received his second nomination for a Best Director Academy Award (again unsuccessfully, this time losing to Barry Levinson for Rain Man). In 1989, Scorsese collaborated with directors Francis Ford Coppola and Woody Allen in the anthology film New York Stories (1989), where he directed the first segment, "Life Lessons", co-written by Richard Price, who wrote The Color of Money. Ebert gave the film a mixed review, while praising Scorsese's short as "really successful".

=== 1990–1999: Established director ===
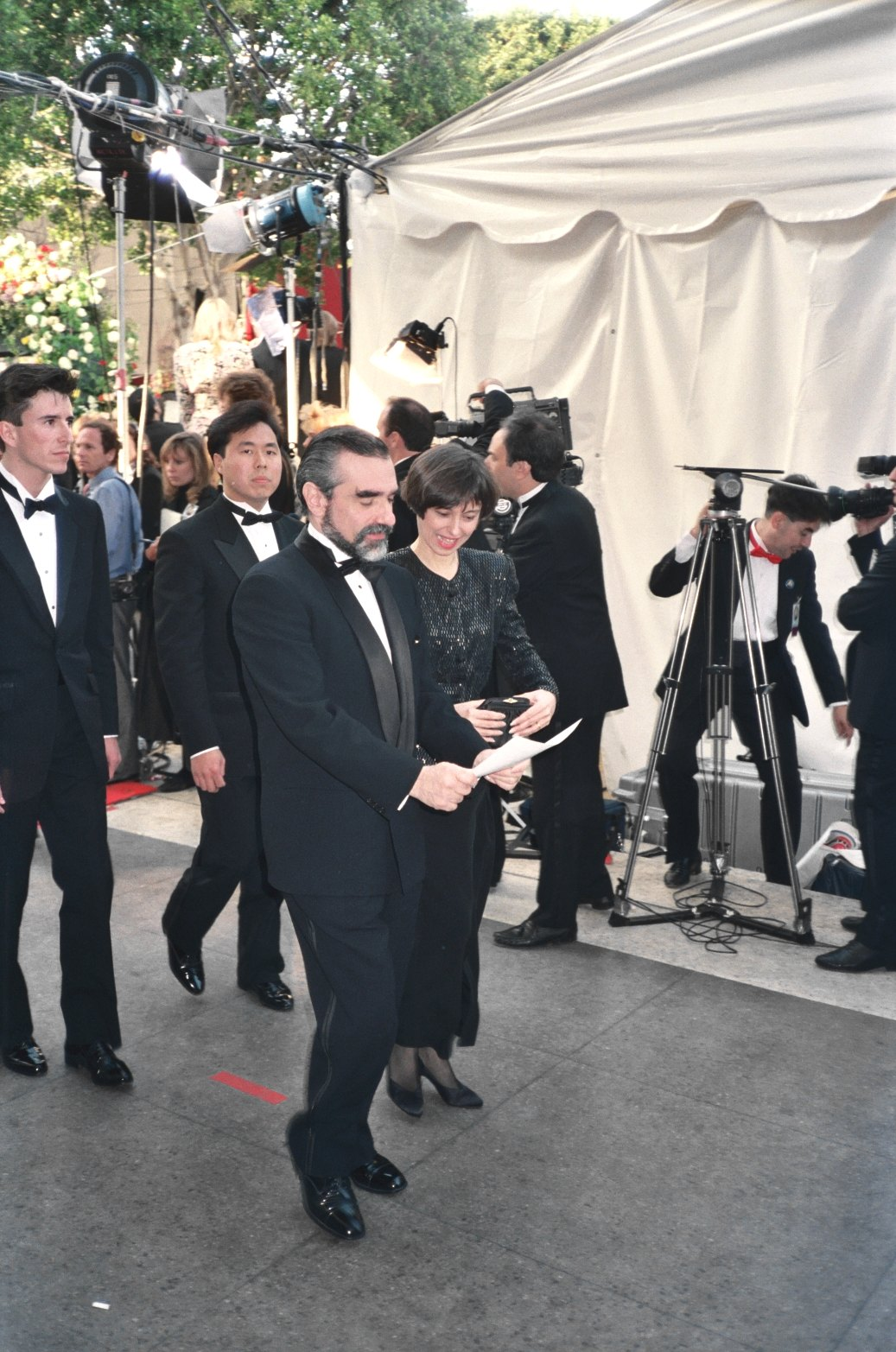
Scorsese at the 63rd Academy Awards (1991)

After a decade of films considered by critics to be mixed results, some considered Scorsese's gangster epic Goodfellas (1990) his return to directorial form, and his most confident and fully realized film since Raging Bull. De Niro and Joe Pesci offered a virtuoso display of Scorsese's bravura cinematic technique in the film and re-established, enhanced, and consolidated his reputation. After the film was released, Roger Ebert, a friend and supporter of Scorsese, named Goodfellas "the best mob movie ever". It is ranked No. 1 on Ebert's movie list for 1990, along with those of Gene Siskel and Peter Travers', and is widely considered one of the director's greatest achievements. The film was nominated for six Academy Awards, including Best Picture and Best Director, and Scorsese earned his third Best Director nomination but again lost to a first-time director, Kevin Costner (Dances with Wolves). Joe Pesci earned the Academy Award for Best Supporting Actor for his performance. Scorsese and the film also won many other awards, including five BAFTA Awards, a Silver Lion and more. The American Film Institute placed Goodfellas at No. 94 on the AFI's 100 Years ... 100 Movies list. On the 2007 updated version, they moved Goodfellas up to No. 92 on the AFI's 100 Years ... 100 Movies list (10th Anniversary Edition) and put Goodfellas at No. 2 on their list of the top 10 gangster films (after The Godfather).

In 1990, he released his only short-form documentary: Made in Milan about fashion designer Giorgio Armani. The following year brought Cape Fear, a remake of a cult 1962 movie of the same name and the director's seventh collaboration with De Niro. Another foray into the mainstream, the film was a stylized thriller taking its cues heavily from Alfred Hitchcock and Charles Laughton's The Night of the Hunter (1955). The film garnered two Oscar nominations, and earned $80 million in domestic box office, placing it as Scorsese's most commercially successful release until The Aviator (2004), and then The Departed (2006). The film also marked the first time Scorsese used wide-screen Panavision with an aspect ratio of 2.39:1.

In 1990, Scorsese acted in a small role as Vincent van Gogh in the film Dreams by Japanese director Akira Kurosawa. Scorsese's 1994 cameo appearance in the Robert Redford film Quiz Show is remembered for the telling line: "You see, the audience didn't tune in to watch some amazing display of intellectual ability. They just wanted to watch the money."

In 1994, Scorsese and producer Barbara De Fina formed the production company De Fina-Cappa. In the early 1990s, Scorsese also expanded his role as a film producer. He produced a wide range of films, including major Hollywood studio productions (Mad Dog and Glory, Clockers), low-budget independent films (The Grifters, Naked in New York, Grace of My Heart, Search and Destroy, The Hi-Lo Country), and even the foreign film Con gli occhi chiusi (With Closed Eyes).

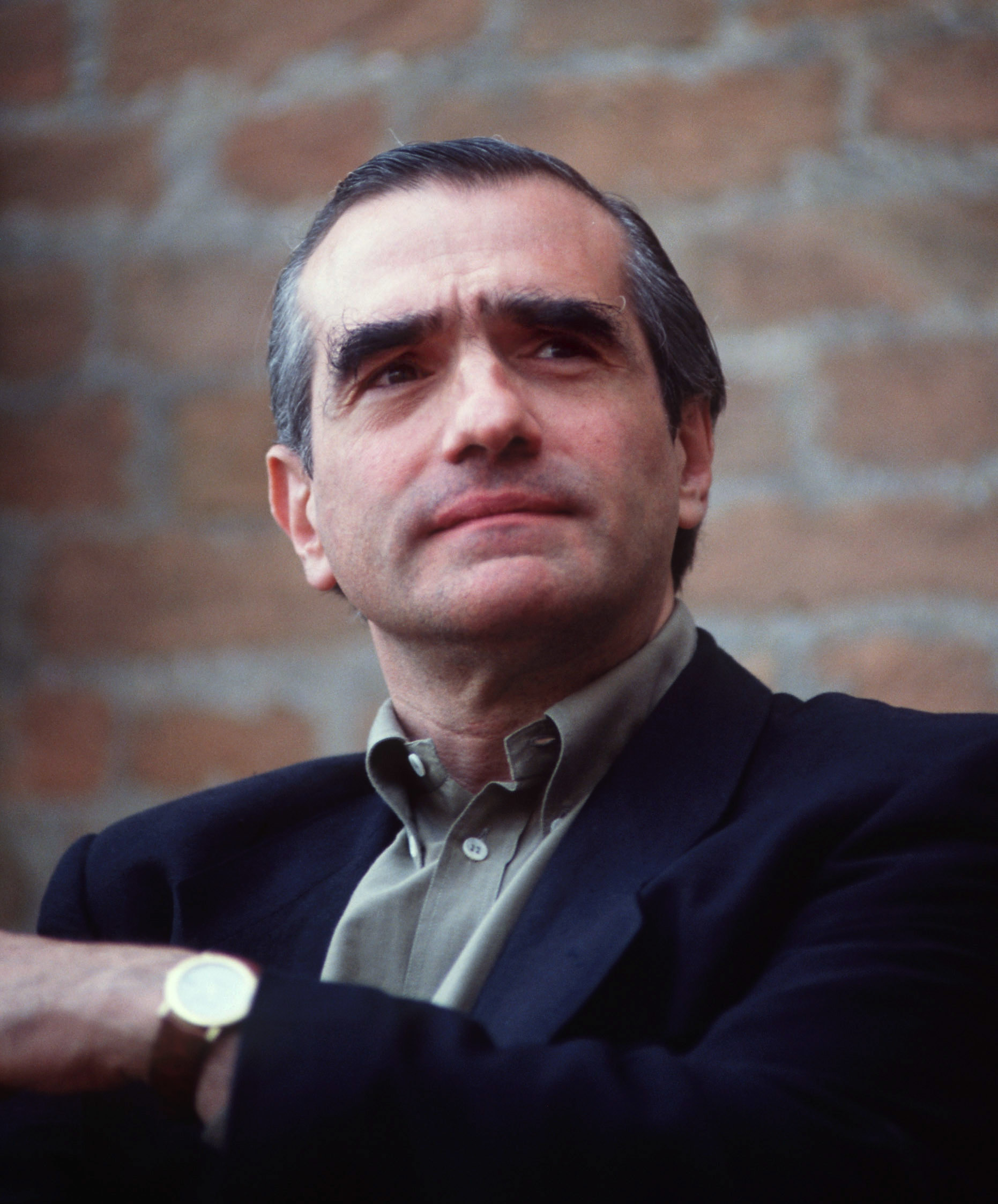
Scorsese in 1995

The Age of Innocence (1993) was a significant departure for Scorsese, a period adaptation of the Edith Wharton novel about the constrictive high society of late-19th century New York. It was highly lauded by critics upon its original release but was a box office bomb, making an overall loss. As noted in Scorsese on Scorsese by editor–interviewer Ian Christie, the news that Scorsese wanted to make a film about a failed 19th-century romance raised many eyebrows among the film fraternity, all the more when Scorsese made it clear that it was a personal project and not a studio for-hire job.

Scorsese was interested in doing a "romantic piece", and he was strongly drawn to the characters and the story of Wharton's text. Scorsese wanted his film to be as rich an emotional experience as the book was to him rather than the traditional academic adaptations of literary works. To this end, Scorsese sought influence from diverse period films that had had an emotional impact on him. In Scorsese on Scorsese, he documents influences from films such as Luchino Visconti's Senso and his Il Gattopardo (The Leopard) as well as Orson Welles's The Magnificent Ambersons and also Roberto Rossellini's La prise de pouvoir par Louis XIV (The Taking of Power by Louis XIV). Although The Age of Innocence was ultimately different from these films in terms of narrative, story, and thematic concern, the presence of a lost society, of lost values as well as detailed re-creations of social customs and rituals continues the tradition of these films. It came back into the public eye, especially in countries such as the UK and France, but still is largely neglected in North America. The film earned five Academy Award nominations (including Best Adapted Screenplay for Scorsese), winning the Costume Design Oscar. This was his first collaboration with the Academy Award-winning actor Daniel Day-Lewis, with whom he would work again on Gangs of New York. This was Scorsese's first film to be shot on Super 35 format.

Casino (1995), like The Age of Innocence before it, focused on a tightly wound male whose well-ordered life is disrupted by the arrival of unpredictable forces. The fact that it was a violent gangster film made it more palatable to the director's fans who perhaps were baffled by the apparent departure of the earlier film. Casino was a box office success, and it received generally positive notices from critics. Comparisons were drawn to his earlier film Goodfellas, and Scorsese admitted Casino bore a superficial resemblance to it, but he maintained that the story was significantly larger in scope. Sharon Stone was nominated for the Best Actress Academy Award for her performance. During the filming, Scorsese played a background part as a gambler at one of the tables.

Scorsese still found time for a four-hour documentary in 1995, titled A Personal Journey with Martin Scorsese Through American Movies, offering a thorough trek through American cinema. It covered the silent era to 1969, a year after which Scorsese began his feature career. He said, "I wouldn't feel right commenting on myself or my contemporaries." In the four-hour documentary, Scorsese lists the four aspects of the director he believes are the most important as (1) the director as storyteller; (2) the director as an illusionist: D. W. Griffith or F. W. Murnau, who created new editing techniques among other innovations that made the appearance of sound and color possible later on; (3) the director as a smuggler—filmmakers such as Douglas Sirk, Samuel Fuller, and Vincente Minnelli, who used to hide subversive messages in their films; and (4) the director as iconoclast. In the preface to this documentary, Scorsese states his commitment to the "Director's Dilemma", in which a successful contemporary director must be pragmatic about the realities of getting financing for films of personal esthetic interest by accepting the need of "making one film for the studio, and (then) making one for oneself."

If The Age of Innocence alienated and confused some fans, then Kundun (1997) went several steps further, offering an account of the early life of Tenzin Gyatso, the 14th Dalai Lama, the People's Liberation Army's entry into Tibet, and the Dalai Lama's subsequent exile to India. Not only a departure in subject matter, Kundun saw Scorsese employing a fresh narrative and visual approach. Traditional dramatic devices were substituted for a trance-like meditation achieved through an elaborate tableau of colorful visual images. The film was a source of turmoil for its distributor, Buena Vista Pictures, which was planning significant expansion into the Chinese market at the time. Initially defiant in the face of pressure from Chinese officials, Disney has since distanced itself from the project, hurting Kundun's commercial profile. In the short term, the sheer eclecticism in evidence enhanced the director's reputation. In the long term, however, it appears Kundun has been sidelined in most critical appraisals of the director, mostly noted as a stylistic and thematic detour. Kundun was Scorsese's second attempt to profile the life of a great religious leader, following The Last Temptation of Christ.

Bringing Out the Dead (1999) was a return to familiar territory, with the director and writer Paul Schrader constructing a pitch-black comic take on their own earlier Taxi Driver. Like earlier Scorsese-Schrader collaborations, its final scenes of spiritual redemption explicitly recall the films of Robert Bresson. (It is also worth noting that the film's incident-filled nocturnal setting is reminiscent of After Hours.) It received generally positive reviews, although not the universal critical acclaim of some of his other films. It stars Nicolas Cage, Ving Rhames, John Goodman, Tom Sizemore, and Patricia Arquette.

On various occasions Scorsese has been asked to present the Honorary Academy Award during the Oscar telecast. In 1998, at the 70th Academy Awards, Scorsese presented the award to film legend Stanley Donen. When accepting the award Donen quipped, "Marty this is backwards, I should be giving this to you, believe me". In 1999, at the 71st Academy Awards, Scorsese and De Niro presented the award to film director Elia Kazan. This was a controversial pick for the academy due to Kazan's involvement with the Hollywood blacklist in the 1950s. Several members of the audience including Nick Nolte and Ed Harris refused to applaud Kazan when he received the award while others such as Warren Beatty, Meryl Streep, Kathy Bates, and Kurt Russell gave him a standing ovation.

=== 2000–2015: Film and television work ===
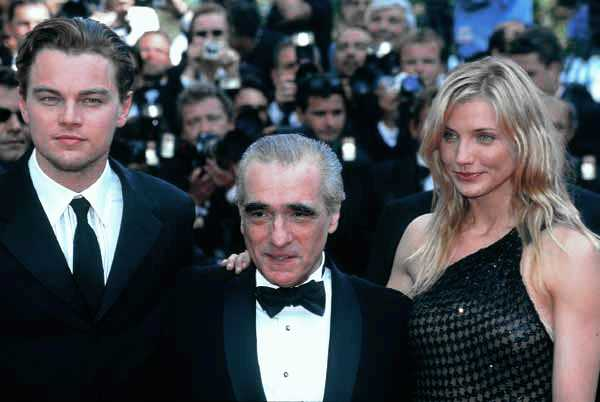
At the Gangs of New York screening at the 2002 Cannes Film Festival with Leonardo DiCaprio and Cameron Diaz

In 1999, Scorsese directed a documentary on Italian filmmakers titled Il Mio Viaggio in Italia, also known as My Voyage to Italy. The documentary foreshadowed Scorsese's next project, the epic Gangs of New York (2002), influenced by (amongst many others) major Italian directors such as Luchino Visconti and filmed in its entirety at Rome's famous Cinecittà film studios. With a production budget said to be in excess of $100 million, Gangs of New York was Scorsese's biggest and arguably most mainstream venture to date. Like The Age of Innocence, it was set in 19th-century New York, although focusing on the other end of the social scale (and like that film, also starring Daniel Day-Lewis). The film marked the first collaboration between Scorsese and actor Leonardo DiCaprio, who became a fixture in later Scorsese films. The production was highly troubled, with many rumors referring to the director's conflict with Miramax Films boss Harvey Weinstein. The final cut of the movie ran to 168 minutes, while Scorsese's original cut was over 180 minutes long.

Despite denials of artistic compromise, some felt that Gangs of New York was Scorsese's most conventional film, featuring standard film tropes that Scorsese had traditionally avoided, such as characters existing purely for exposition purposes and explanatory flashbacks. Even so, the film received generally positive reviews with the review aggregator Rotten Tomatoes reporting that 75 percent of the reviews for the film they tallied were positive and summarizing the critics writing, "Though flawed, the sprawling, messy Gangs of New York is redeemed by impressive production design and Day-Lewis's electrifying performance." The film's central themes are consistent with Scorsese's established concerns: New York, violence as culturally endemic, and subcultural divisions down ethnic lines. Originally filmed for a release in the winter of 2001 (to qualify for Academy Award nominations), Scorsese delayed the final production of the film until after the beginning of 2002; Miramax Films consequently delayed the film until its release in the Oscar season of late 2002. Gangs of New York earned Scorsese his first Golden Globe for Best Director. In February 2003, Gangs of New York received 10 Academy Award nominations, including Best Picture, Best Director, and Best Actor for Daniel Day-Lewis; however, it did not win in any category.

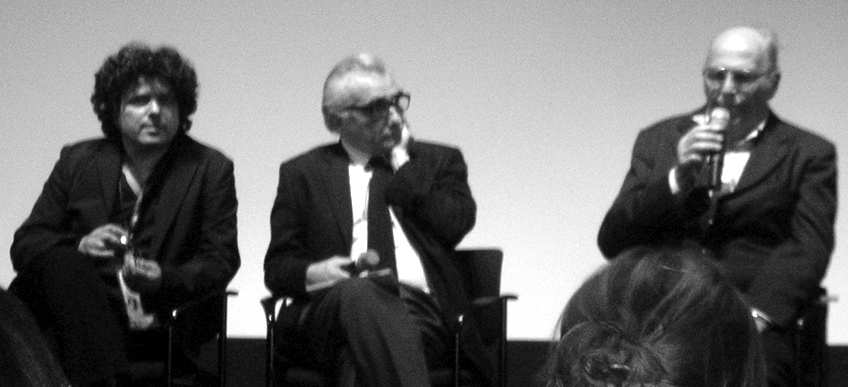
From left to right: Salvo Cuccia, Scorsese, and Vittorio De Seta at the 2005 Tribeca Film Festival

The following year, Scorsese completed production of The Blues, an expansive seven-part documentary tracing the history of blues music from its African roots to the Mississippi Delta and beyond. Seven filmmakers including Wim Wenders, Clint Eastwood, Mike Figgis, and Scorsese himself each contributed a 90-minute film (Scorsese's entry was titled Feel Like Going Home). In the early 2000s, Scorsese produced several films for up-and-coming directors, such as You Can Count on Me (directed by Kenneth Lonergan), Rain (directed by Katherine Lindberg), Lymelife (directed by Derick Martini) and The Young Victoria (directed by Jean-Marc Vallée). At that time, he established Sikelia Productions. In 2003, producer Emma Tillinger Koskoff joined the company. Scorsese also produced several documentaries, such as The Soul of a Man (directed by Wim Wenders) and Lightning in a Bottle (directed by Antoine Fuqua).

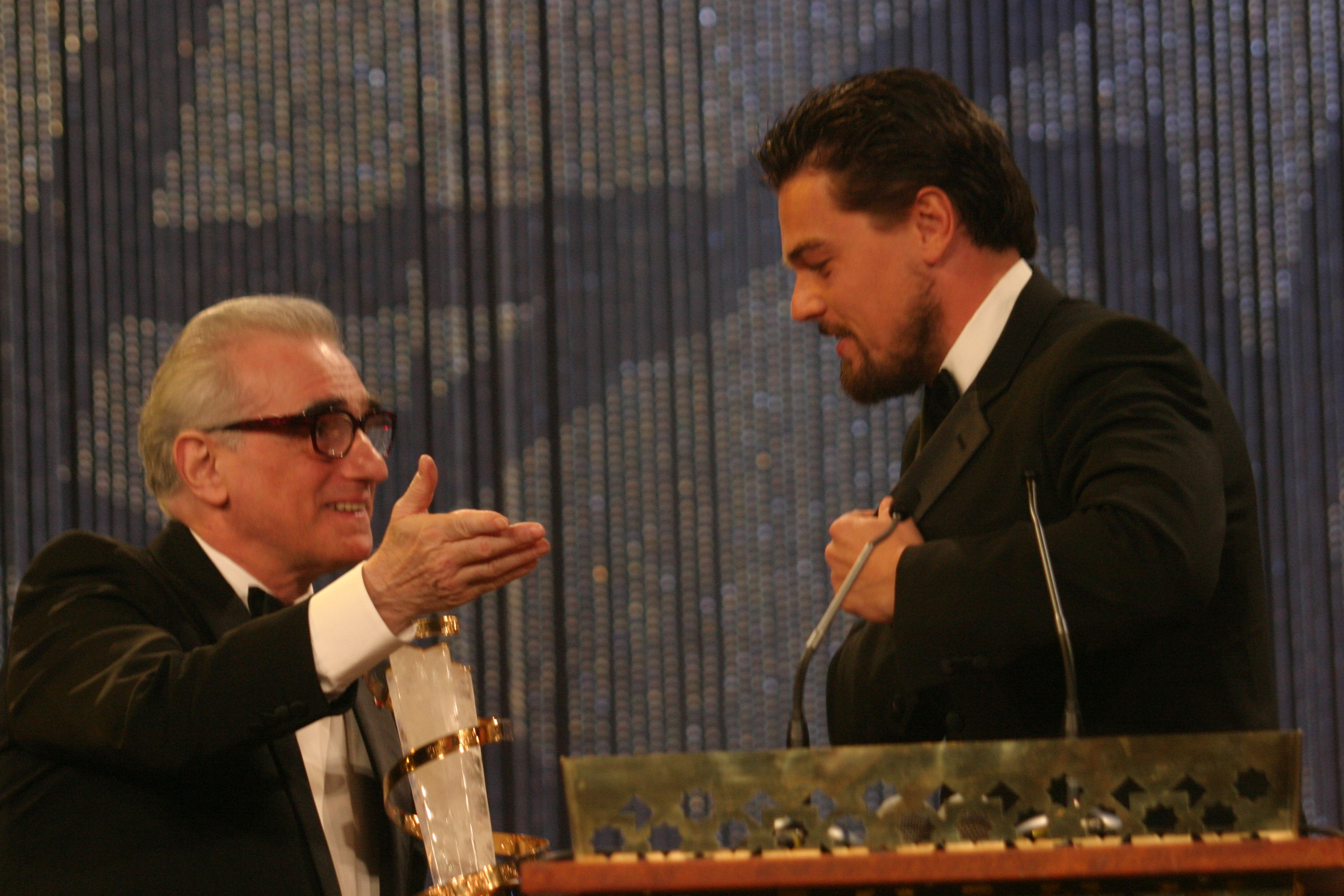
Scorsese (left) with Leonardo DiCaprio at the 2007 Marrakech International Film Festival

Scorsese's film The Aviator (2004) is a lavish, large-scale biopic of eccentric aviation pioneer and film mogul Howard Hughes and reunited Scorsese with actor Leonardo DiCaprio. The film received highly positive reviews. The film was a widespread box office success and gained Academy recognition. The Aviator was nominated for six Golden Globe Awards, including Best Motion Picture-Drama, Best Director, Best Screenplay, and Best Actor-Motion Picture Drama for Leonardo DiCaprio. It won three, including Best Motion Picture-Drama and Best Actor-Motion Picture Drama. In January 2005 The Aviator became the most-nominated film of the 77th Academy Awards nominations, nominated in 11 categories including Best Picture. The film also garnered nominations in nearly all the other major categories, including a fifth Best Director nomination for Scorsese. Despite having the most nominations, the film won only five Oscars. Scorsese lost again, this time to director Clint Eastwood for Million Dollar Baby (which also won Best Picture).

No Direction Home is a documentary film by Scorsese that tells of the life of Bob Dylan, and his impact on American popular music and the culture of the 20th century. The film does not cover Dylan's entire career; it focuses on his beginnings, his rise to fame in the 1960s, his then-controversial transformation from an acoustic guitar-based musician and performer to an electric guitar-influenced sound and his "retirement" from touring in 1966 following an infamous motorcycle accident. The film was first presented on television in both the United States (as part of the PBS American Masters series) and the United Kingdom (as part of the BBC Two Arena series) on September 26 to 27, 2005. A DVD version of the film was released the same month. The film won a Peabody Award and the Grammy Award for Best Long Form Music Video. In addition, Scorsese received a Primetime Emmy Award nomination for Outstanding Directing for a Documentary/Nonfiction Program, losing to Baghdad ER.

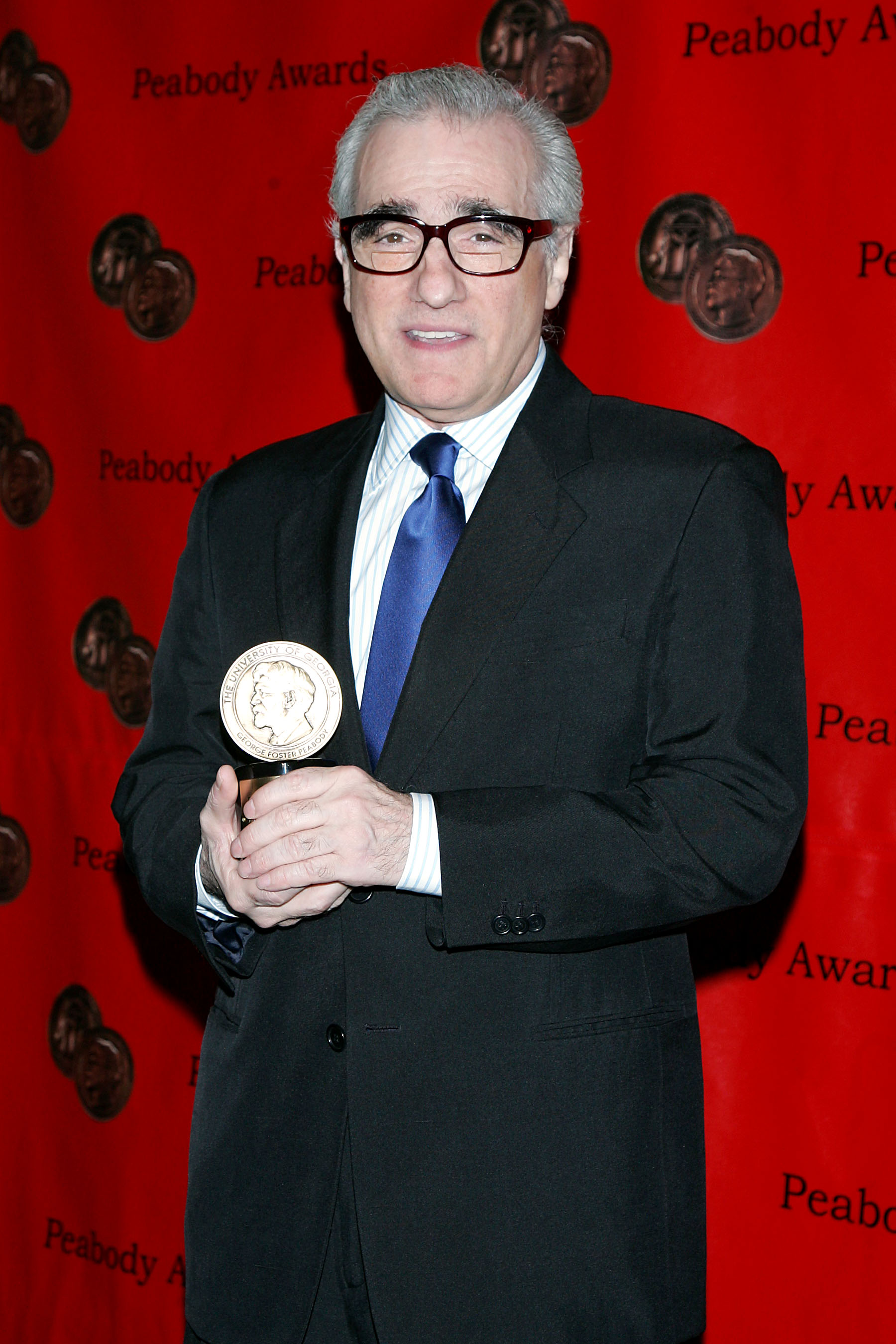
Scorsese at the 65th Annual Peabody Awards in mid-2006

Scorsese returned to the crime genre with the Boston-set thriller The Departed, based on the Hong Kong police drama Infernal Affairs (which is co-directed by Andrew Lau and Alan Mak). The film continued Scorsese's collaboration with Leonardo DiCaprio and was the first time he worked with Matt Damon, Jack Nicholson, Mark Wahlberg, and Martin Sheen. The Departed opened to widespread critical acclaim, with some proclaiming it as one of the best efforts Scorsese had brought to the screen since 1990's Goodfellas, and still others putting it at the same level as Scorsese's most celebrated classics Taxi Driver and Raging Bull. With domestic box office receipts surpassing US$129.4 million, The Departed was Scorsese's highest-grossing film (not accounting for inflation) until 2010's Shutter Island. The Departed earned Scorsese a second Golden Globe for Best Director, as well as a Critics' Choice Award, his first Directors Guild of America Award, and the Academy Award for Best Director. Presented with the latter, Scorsese poked fun at his track record of nominations, asking, "Could you double-check the envelope?" The award was presented by his longtime friends and colleagues Francis Ford Coppola, George Lucas and Steven Spielberg. The Departed also received the Academy Award for the Best Motion Picture of 2006, Best Adapted Screenplay, and Best Film Editing by longtime Scorsese editor Thelma Schoonmaker, her third win for a Scorsese film.

Shine a Light captures rock and roll band The Rolling Stones' performing at New York City's Beacon Theatre on October 29 and November 1, 2006, intercut with brief news and interview footage from throughout their career. The film was initially scheduled for release on September 21, 2007, but Paramount Classics postponed its general release until April 2008. Its world premiere was at the opening of the 58th Berlinale Film Festival on February 7, 2008. "Marty did an amazing job of making us look great ..." observed drummer Charlie Watts. "It's all in the edits and the cuts. That's a movie maker rather than a guy just shooting a band onstage ... It's not Casablanca, but it's a great thing to have from our point of view, not being egotistical. It's a document."

In 2009, Scorsese signed a petition in support of director Roman Polanski, who had been detained while traveling to a film festival in relation to his 1977 sexual abuse charges, which the petition argued would undermine the tradition of film festivals as a place for works to be shown "freely and safely", and that arresting filmmakers traveling to neutral countries could open the door "for actions of which no-one can know the effects."

On October 22, 2007, Daily Variety reported that Scorsese would reunite with Leonardo DiCaprio on a fourth picture, Shutter Island. Principal photography on the Laeta Kalogridis screenplay, based on the novel of the same name by Dennis Lehane, began in Massachusetts in March 2008. In December 2007, actors Mark Ruffalo, Max von Sydow, Ben Kingsley, and Michelle Williams joined the cast, marking the first time these actors had worked with Scorsese. The film was released on February 19, 2010. On May 20, 2010, Shutter Island became Scorsese's highest-grossing film. In 2010, The Wall Street Journal reported that Scorsese was supporting the David Lynch Foundation's initiative to help 10,000 military veterans overcome posttraumatic stress disorder through Transcendental Meditation; Scorsese has publicly discussed his own practice of TM.

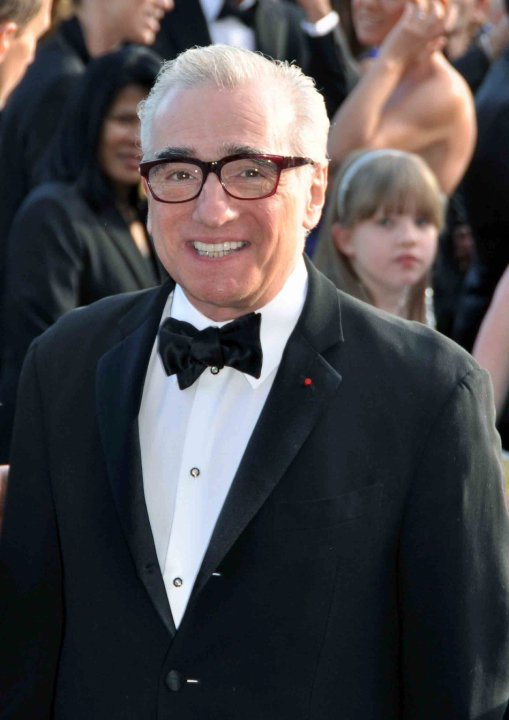
Scorsese at Cannes in 2010

Scorsese directed a television commercial for Chanel's then-new men's fragrance, Bleu de Chanel, starring French actor Gaspard Ulliel. Filmed in New York City, it debuted online on August 25, 2010, and was released on TV in September 2010. Scorsese directed the series premiere for Boardwalk Empire, an HBO drama series, starring Steve Buscemi and Michael Pitt, based on Nelson Johnson's book Boardwalk Empire: The Birth, High Times and Corruption of Atlantic City. Terence Winter, who wrote for The Sopranos, created the series. In addition to directing the pilot (for which he won the 2011 Primetime Emmy Award for Outstanding Directing), Scorsese also served as an executive producer on the series. The series premiered on September 19, 2010, and ran for five seasons.

Scorsese directed the three-and-a-half-hour documentary George Harrison: Living in the Material World about the life and music of former Beatles' member George Harrison, which premiered in the United States on HBO over two parts on October 5 and 6, 2011. His next film Hugo is a 3D adventure drama film based on Brian Selznick's novel The Invention of Hugo Cabret. The film stars Asa Butterfield, Chloë Grace Moretz, Ben Kingsley, Sacha Baron Cohen, Ray Winstone, Emily Mortimer, Christopher Lee, and Jude Law. The film has been met with critical acclaim and earned Scorsese his third Golden Globe Award for Best Director. The film was also nominated for 11 Academy Awards, winning five of them and becoming tied with Michel Hazanavicius's film The Artist for the most Academy Awards won by a single film in 2011. Hugo also won two BAFTA awards, among numerous other awards and nominations. Hugo was Scorsese's first 3D film and was released in the United States on November 23, 2011.

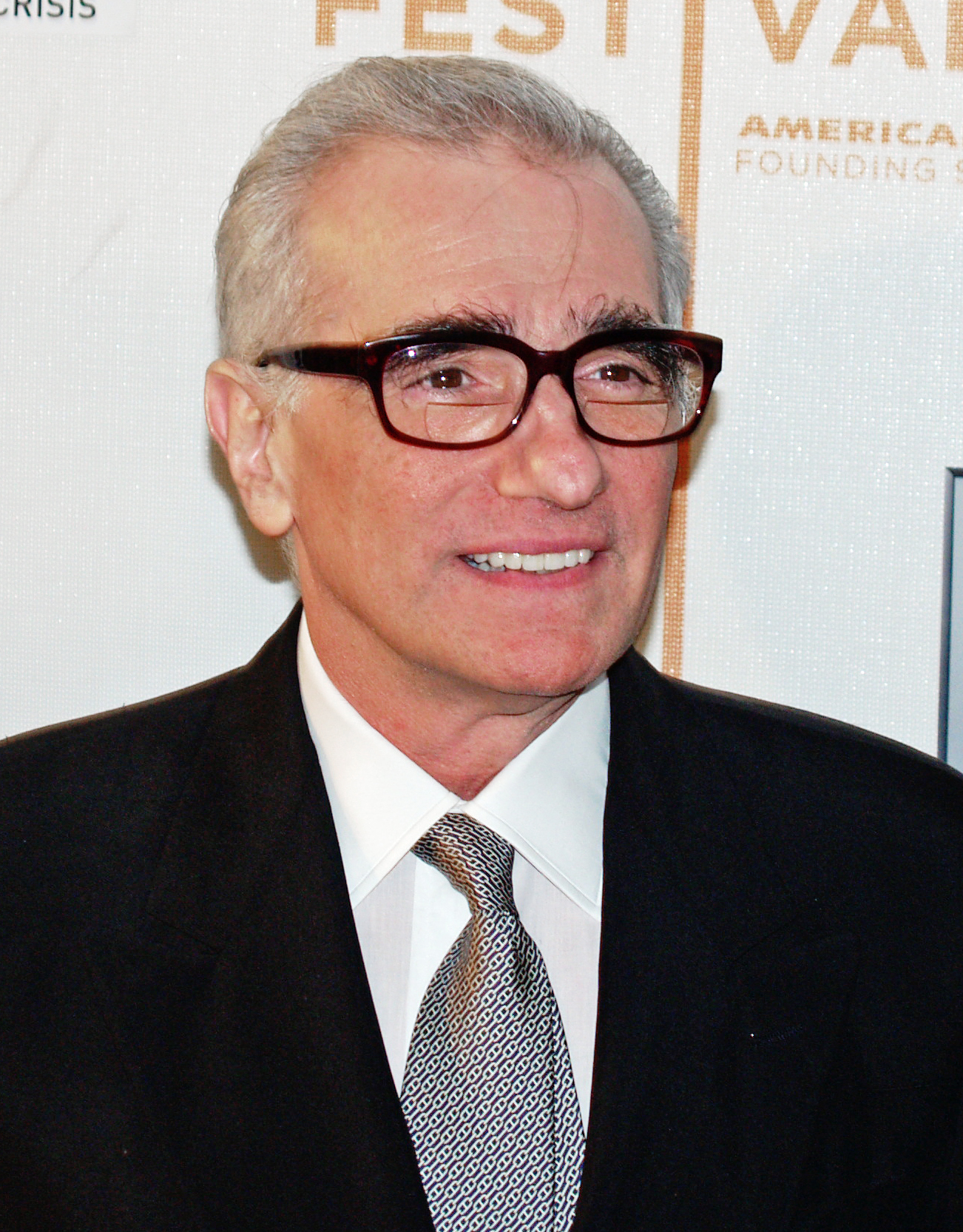
At the Tribeca Film Festival in 2007

Scorsese's 2013 film, The Wolf of Wall Street, is an American biographical black comedy based on Jordan Belfort's memoir of the same name. The screenplay was written by Terence Winter and starred Leonardo DiCaprio as Belfort, along with Jonah Hill, Matthew McConaughey, and others. The film marked the fifth collaboration between Scorsese and DiCaprio and the second between Scorsese and Winter after Boardwalk Empire. It was released on December 25, 2013. The film tells the story of a New York stockbroker, played by DiCaprio, who engages in a large securities fraud case involving illicit stock manipulation, by way of the practice of "pump and dump". DiCaprio was given the award for Best Actor-Motion Picture Musical or Comedy at the 2014 Golden Globe Awards. The film was also nominated for Best Motion Picture-Musical or Comedy as well. The Wolf of Wall Street was nominated for five Academy Awards, including Best Picture, Best Actor for Leonardo DiCaprio, Best Supporting Actor for Jonah Hill, Best Director for Martin Scorsese, and Best Adapted Screenplay for Terence Winter but did not win in any category. In a 2016 critics' poll conducted by the BBC, the film was ranked among the 100 greatest motion pictures since 2000.

Scorsese and David Tedeschi made a documentary about the history of The New York Review of Books, titled The 50 Year Argument. It screened as a work in progress at the Berlin International Film Festival in February 2014 and premiered in June 2014 at the Sheffield DocFest. It was also screened in Oslo, and Jerusalem before being shown on the BBC's Arena series in July and at Telluride in August. In September, it was screened at the Toronto and Calgary International Film Festivals, and the New York Film Festival. It aired on HBO on September 29, 2014.

Scorsese directed the pilot for Vinyl written by Terence Winter and George Mastras, with Mick Jagger producing and Mastras as showrunner. The series stars Bobby Cannavale as Richie Finestra, founder and president of a top-tier record label, set in 1970s New York City's drug-and sex-fueled music business as punk and disco were breaking out, all told through the eyes of Finestra trying to resurrect his label and find the next new sound. Filming began on July 25, 2014. Co-stars include Ray Romano, Olivia Wilde, Juno Temple, Andrew Dice Clay, Ato Essandoh, Max Casella, and James Jagger. On December 2, 2014, Vinyl was picked up by HBO. The series lasted one season. Scorsese has acted as executive producer of several indie films, like the 2014 The Third Side of the River (directed by his protege Celina Murga), another 2014 film Revenge of the Green Dragons (co-directed by Andrew Lau, whose film Infernal Affairs inspired The Departed), as well as Bleed for This and Free Fire.

Scorsese directed The Audition, a short film that also served as a promotional piece for casinos Studio City in Macau and City of Dreams in Manila, Philippines. The short brought together Scorsese's long-time muses Leonardo DiCaprio and Robert De Niro for the first time under his direction. The short film featured the two actors, playing fictionalized versions of themselves, competing for a role in Scorsese's next film. It was Scorsese's first collaboration with De Niro in two decades. The film premiered in October 2015 in conjunction with the grand opening of Studio City.

=== 2016–present ===
Scorsese had long anticipated filming an adaptation of Shūsaku Endō's novel Silence, a drama about the lives of two Portuguese Jesuit priests in Japan during the 17th century. He had originally planned Silence as his next project following Shutter Island. On April 19, 2013, financing was secured for Silence by Emmett/Furla Films, and filming began in January 2015. By November 2016, the film had completed post-production. It was written by Jay Cocks and Scorsese, based on the novel, and stars Andrew Garfield, Liam Neeson, and Adam Driver. The film was released on December 23, 2016, to positive reviews from critics. Scorsese was recognized as an Italian citizen by jus sanguinis in 2018.

On January 10, 2019, Variety's Chris Willman reported that Scorsese's long-anticipated documentary of Bob Dylan's 1975 tour, the Rolling Thunder Revue, would be released by Netflix: "Rolling Thunder Revue: A Bob Dylan Story by Martin Scorsese captures the troubled spirit of America in 1975 and the joyous music that Dylan performed during the fall of that year. Part documentary, part concert film, part fever dream, Rolling Thunder is a one of a kind experience, from master filmmaker Martin Scorsese." On April 25, 2019, it was announced that the documentary would be released on Netflix on June 12, 2019, with a concurrent theatrical engagement in twenty American, European, and Australian cities the night before, and an extended theatrical schedule in Los Angeles and New York so that the film will qualify for award consideration. After years of development, principal photography on Scorsese's crime film The Irishman, based on the book I Heard You Paint Houses by Charles Brandt, began in August 2017, starring Robert De Niro, Joe Pesci, and Al Pacino. The film had its world premiere at the 57th New York Film Festival on September 27, 2019. It received a limited theatrical release on November 1, 2019, followed by digital streaming on November 27, 2019, on Netflix. In January 2020, The Irishman received ten Academy Award nominations, including for Best Picture, Best Director, Best Adapted Screenplay, and Best Supporting Actor for Pacino and Pesci.

On December 29, 2020, the trailer for Scorsese's Netflix documentary series Pretend It's a City was released. The series features Fran Lebowitz and Scorsese as they delve into her personal beliefs and thoughts on New York City. The project was released January 8, 2021, on Netflix. This is Scorsese's second documentary featuring Lebowitz, the first being Public Speaking (2010), which was released on HBO. In October 2022, Scorsese and David Tedeschi premiered their collaborative film Personality Crisis: One Night Only, at the New York Film Festival. The film is a documentary about David Johansen, featuring both contemporary concert footage shot for the project as well as archival footage.

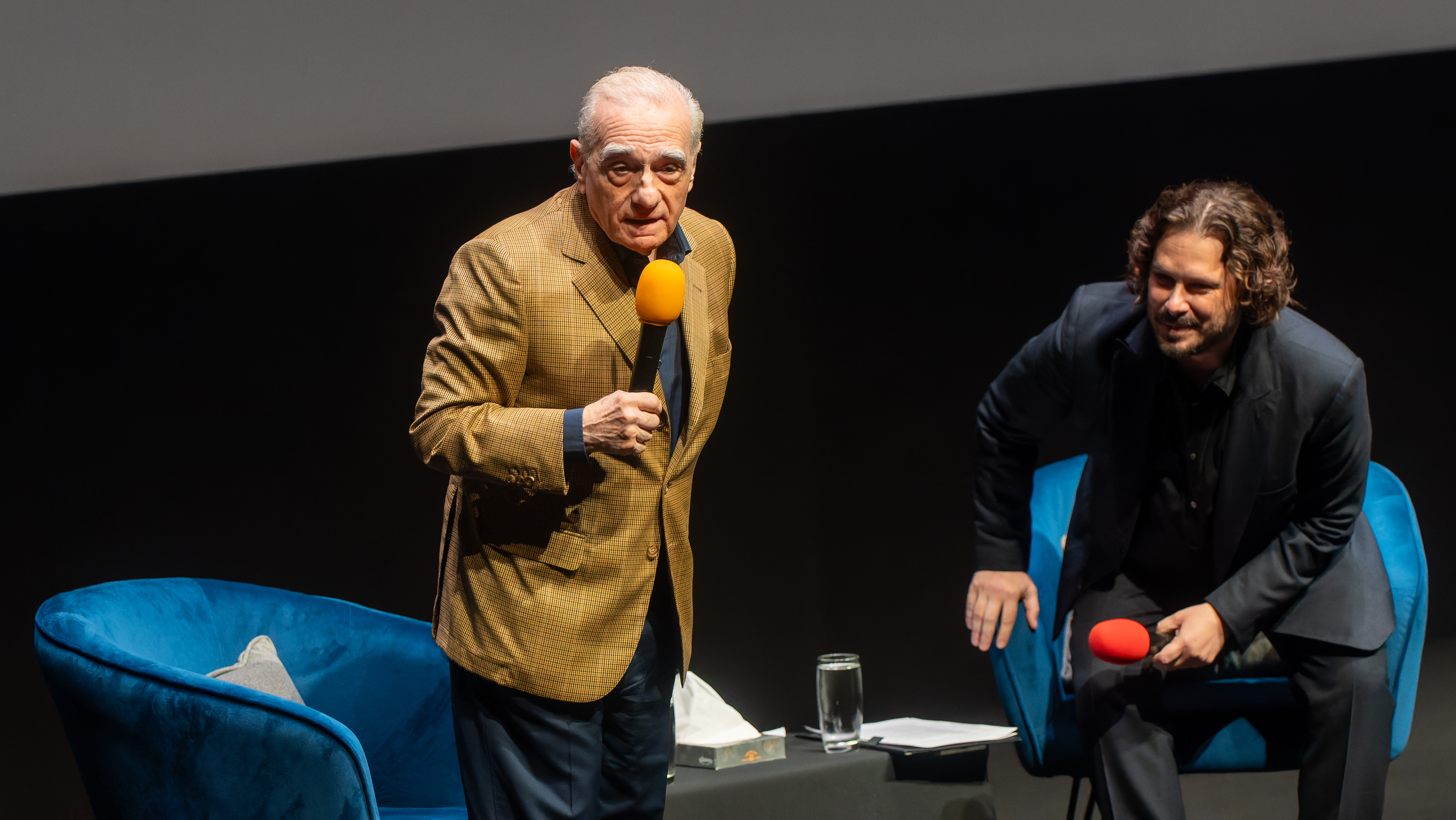
Scorsese with Edgar Wright at the London Film Festival in 2023

In July 2019, Scorsese started scouting locations in preparation for the 2020 filming of his next film Killers of the Flower Moon, a film adaptation of the book of the same name by David Grann. Scorsese would team up with Leonardo DiCaprio for the sixth time and Robert De Niro for the tenth time. In December 2019, Scorsese's frequent cinematographer Rodrigo Prieto confirmed that Flower Moon was gearing up to start principal photography in March 2020, which was postponed due to the COVID-19 pandemic. In November 2020 Scorsese was hounored with Stockholm Lifetime Achievement Award. In April 2020, it was announced that filming for Killers of the Flower Moon had been postponed indefinitely in response to the COVID-19 pandemic, that the potential cost of the film had ballooned to $200 million, and that Scorsese was in talks with Netflix or Apple to produce and distribute, with Paramount Pictures involved as a partner. On May 27, 2020, Apple bought the production and distribution rights to the film, which was released theatrically by Paramount and streamed on Apple TV. Principal photography commenced in April 2021. It premiered at the 76th Cannes Film Festival on May 20, 2023, receiving a nine-minute standing ovation and was released theatrically on October 20, 2023. On May 16, 2023, while promoting Killers of the Flower Moon, Scorsese spoke about his eagerness to continue working, stating: "I'm old. I read stuff. I see things. I want to tell stories, and there's no more time." It was nominated for ten Oscars, and seven Golden Globes, winning one for Best Actress in a Drama for Lily Gladstone. That same year, he directed a commercial for Bleu de Chanel starring Timothée Chalamet.

In 2024, Scorsese narrated the documentary film Made in England: The Films of Powell and Pressburger directed by David Hinton. Guy Lodge of Variety wrote: "Scorsese may not have directed this engaging tour through a vital filmography, but he narrates with palpable, personal devotion to his subject." The film premiered at the Berlin International Film Festival where it was picked up for distribution by MUBI.

Scorsese had a role in the May 2026 Star Wars movie The Mandalorian and Grogu as the voice of an Ardennian shopkeep.

==== Upcoming and prospective projects ====
Scorsese's next film is What Happens at Night, an adaptation of the Peter Cameron novel, with DiCaprio set to star alongside Jennifer Lawrence. Announced on September 18, 2025, the film started production in February 2026.

In November 2021, Scorsese was set to direct a biopic feature about rock band the Grateful Dead for Apple Studios featuring Jonah Hill. In July 2022, it was announced Scorsese would direct an adaptation of David Grann's non-fiction novel The Wager for Apple Studios, reteaming once again with DiCaprio. In May 2023, after meeting with Pope Francis, Scorsese said he was considering writing and directing a new film about Jesus. More details were revealed in January 2024, revealing that it could be Scorsese's next film and that he had co-written it with Kent Jones, based on the Shūsaku Endō novel A Life of Jesus. In 2023, during an interview with GQ, it was revealed that Scorsese was working on an adaptation of Marilynne Robinson's Home with Todd Field and Jones. In March 2025, it was reported that he would adapt Home for Apple TV with DiCaprio starring. It was reported in February 2025 that Scorsese would be directing a mob film set in Hawaii, starring and being co-produced by Dwayne Johnson, Leonardo DiCaprio and Emily Blunt. Johnson and Blunt pitched the plot to Scorsese and DiCaprio, which was described as being "a cross between Goodfellas and The Departed", and Nick Bilton was hired as a screenwriter.

== Filmmaking style and technique ==
Several recurring filmmaking techniques are identifiable in many of Scorsese's films. He has established a filmmaking history which involves repeat collaborations with actors, screenwriters, film editors, and cinematographers, sometimes extending over several decades, such as that with recurring cinematographers Michael Ballhaus, Robert Richardson, and Rodrigo Prieto.

=== Slow motion and freeze frame ===
Scorsese is known for his frequent use of slow motion, for example, in Who's That Knocking at My Door (1967) and Mean Streets (1973). He is also known for using freeze frames, such as: in the opening credits of The King of Comedy (1983), throughout Goodfellas (1990), Casino (1995), The Departed (2006), and in The Irishman (2019). His blonde leading ladies are usually seen through the eyes of the protagonist as angelic and ethereal; they wear white in their first scene and are photographed in slow motion—Cybill Shepherd in Taxi Driver; Cathy Moriarty's white bikini in Raging Bull; Sharon Stone's white minidress in Casino. This may be a nod to director Alfred Hitchcock.

Scorsese often uses long tracking shots, as seen in Taxi Driver, Goodfellas, Casino, Gangs of New York, and Hugo. MOS sequences set to popular music or voice-over are regularly seen in his films, often involving aggressive camera movement or rapid editing. Scorsese sometimes highlights characters in a scene with an iris, an homage to 1920s silent film cinema (as scenes at the time sometimes used this transition). This effect can be seen in Casino (it is used on Sharon Stone and Joe Pesci), Life Lessons, The Departed (on Matt Damon), and Hugo. Some of his films include references/allusions to Westerns, particularly Rio Bravo, The Great Train Robbery, Shane, The Searchers, and The Oklahoma Kid. Slow motion flashbulbs and accented camera/flash/shutter sounds are often used, as is the song "Gimme Shelter" by The Rolling Stones heard in several of Scorsese's films: Goodfellas, Casino, and The Departed.

=== Cameo appearances ===
Scorsese usually has a quick cameo in his films (Who's That Knocking at My Door, Boxcar Bertha, Mean Streets, Alice Doesn't Live Here Anymore, Taxi Driver, The King of Comedy, After Hours, The Last Temptation of Christ (albeit hidden under a hood), The Age of Innocence, Gangs of New York, Hugo, Killers of the Flower Moon), he is also known to contribute his voice to a film without appearing on screen (e.g. as in The Aviator and The Wolf of Wall Street). In The Age of Innocence, for example, he appears in the non-speaking role of a large format portrait photographer in one of the passing scenes of the film. He provides the opening voice-over narration in Mean Streets and The Color of Money; plays the off-screen dressing room attendant in the final scene of Raging Bull, and provides the voice of the unseen ambulance dispatcher in Bringing Out the Dead. He also appears as the director of fictional newly formed Vatican Television in the Italian comedy In the Pope's Eye and played himself in the first episode of the TV series The Studio.

=== Religious guilt ===
Guilt is a prominent theme in many of his films, as is the role of Catholicism in creating and dealing with guilt (Who's That Knocking at My Door, Mean Streets, Raging Bull, Bringing Out the Dead, The Departed, Shutter Island, and The Irishman). In a similar manner, Scorsese considered Silence a "passion project": it had been in development since 1990, two years after the release of his film The Last Temptation of Christ, which also contained strongly religious themes. When asked why he retained interest in a project dealing with strong theological themes for over 26 years, Scorsese said,

As you get older, ideas go and come. Questions, answers, loss of the answer again and more questions, and this is what really interests me. Yes, the cinema and the people in my life and my family are most important, but ultimately as you get older, there's got to be more ... Silence is just something that I'm drawn to in that way. It's been an obsession, it has to be done ... it's a strong, wonderful true story, a thriller in a way, but it deals with those questions.

=== Political corruption ===
Beginning in the early 2000s, his films have featured corrupt authority figures, such as policemen in The Departed and politicians in Gangs of New York and The Aviator. He is also known for his liberal usage of profanity, dark humor, and violence.

Scorsese's interest in political corruption as depicted in his films was expanded further in his 2019 film The Irishman. Richard Brody writing for The New Yorker found the main interpretation of the film to be a dark allegory of a realist reading of American politics and American society stating:

The real-life Hoffa... (was) a crucial player in both gangland politics and the actual practical politics of the day, and the movie's key through line is the inseparability of those two realms. The Irishman is a sociopolitical horror story that views much of modern American history as a continuous crime in motion, in which every level of society—from domestic life through local business through big business through national and international politics—is poisoned by graft and bribery, shady deals and dirty money, threats of violence and its gruesome enactment, and the hard-baked impunity that keeps the entire system running.

=== Frequent collaborators ===
Scorsese often casts the same actors in his projects, particularly Robert De Niro, who has collaborated with Scorsese on ten feature films and one short film. Included are the three films (Taxi Driver, Raging Bull, and Goodfellas) that made AFI's 100 Years ... 100 Movies list. Scorsese has often said he thinks De Niro's best work under his direction was Rupert Pupkin in The King of Comedy. After the turn of the century, Scorsese found a new muse with younger actor Leonardo DiCaprio, collaborating on six feature films and one short to date. Several critics have compared Scorsese's new partnership with DiCaprio with his previous one with De Niro. Frequent collaborators also include: Victor Argo (6), Harvey Keitel (6), Harry Northup (6), J. C. MacKenzie (5), Murray Moston (5), Illeana Douglas (4), Joe Pesci (4), Frank Vincent (3), Barry Primus (3), and Verna Bloom (3). Others who have appeared in multiple Scorsese projects include Daniel Day-Lewis, who had become very reclusive to the Hollywood scene, Alec Baldwin, Willem Dafoe, Ben Kingsley, Jude Law, Dick Miller, Liam Neeson, Emily Mortimer, Jesse Plemons, John C. Reilly, David Carradine, Barbara Hershey, Kevin Corrigan, Jake Hoffman, Frank Sivero, Ray Winstone and Nick Nolte. Before their deaths, Scorsese's parents, Charles Scorsese and Catherine Scorsese, appeared in bit parts, walk-ons or supporting roles, such as in Goodfellas.

For his crew, Scorsese frequently worked with editors Marcia Lucas and Thelma Schoonmaker, cinematographers Michael Ballhaus, Robert Richardson, Michael Chapman and Rodrigo Prieto, screenwriters Paul Schrader, Mardik Martin, Jay Cocks, Terrence Winter, John Logan and Steven Zaillian, costume designer Sandy Powell, production designers Dante Ferretti and Bob Shaw, music producer Robbie Robertson, and composers Howard Shore and Elmer Bernstein. Schoonmaker, Richardson, Powell, and Ferretti have each won Academy Awards in their respective categories on collaborations with Scorsese. Elaine and Saul Bass, the latter being Hitchcock's frequent title designer, designed the opening credits for Goodfellas, The Age of Innocence, Casino and Cape Fear.

=== Artificial intelligence ===
In June 2026, Scorsese became an advisor to the artificial intelligence company Black Forest Labs, in a bid to "push the bounds of creativity to create deeper and richer experiences for audiences." In a statement, Scorsese said he utilized the company’s FLUX technology to assist in creating storyboards on a upcoming film, because according to him, "there’s always been this problem of how do you communicate what you see in your head to your cast and crew".

== Personal life ==
=== Marriages, relationships, and children ===
Scorsese has been married five times.

In 1965, Scorsese married Laraine Marie Brennan. They have a daughter, Catherine, who was named after Scorsese's mother. The couple remained together until 1971.

In 1976, Scorsese married writer Julia Cameron. They have a daughter, Domenica Cameron-Scorsese, an actress who appeared in The Age of Innocence. After one year of marriage, the couple had an acrimonious divorce which served as the basis of Cameron's first feature, the dark comedy God's Will, which also starred their daughter. The latter had a small role in Cape Fear using the name Domenica Scorsese and has continued to act, write, direct and produce.

In 1979, Scorsese married actress Isabella Rossellini. The couple divorced in 1983.

In March 1983, Scorsese met Dawn Steel (then-junior executive at Paramount) at an annual ShoWest Convention (in Las Vegas, Nevada), after which the pair began a romantic relationship. Scorsese moved from New York to live in her Sunset Plaza residence while his Last Temptation of Christ was initially in development at Paramount (Steel reportedly recused herself from her boyfriend's passion project). In her 1993 memoir, Steel discussed their relationship, including attending the Cannes Film Festival premiere of The King of Comedy and later location scouting in Tunisia together. The two would reconnect professionally in 1987, jump-starting the restoration of Lawrence of Arabia (shortly after Steel's installation as president at Columbia Pictures).

In 1985, Scorsese married producer Barbara De Fina. The couple divorced in 1991.

From 1989 to 1997, Scorsese was romantically involved with actress Illeana Douglas.

In 1999, Scorsese married Helen Schermerhorn Morris. They have a daughter, actress and filmmaker Francesca, who appeared in his films The Departed, Hugo, and The Aviator, and had a leading role in HBO/Sky's miniseries We Are Who We Are in 2020.

=== Political views ===
Scorsese was an opponent of the Iraq War, wearing a white dove pin to the 75th Academy Awards in 2003 and clapping for Michael Moore's acceptance speech wherein he criticized President George W. Bush and the invasion. In June 2025, Scorsese said of Donald Trump's administration: "I do not see compassion in this administration. Indeed, it seems that it takes pleasure in the opposite: hurting, humiliating."

=== Legal issues ===
In March 2024, Scorsese settled a lawsuit with aspiring screenwriter Simon Afram. Afram accused him of pocketing $500,000 to help handle casting, production and postproduction of his screenplay about World War II's Operation Fortitude, which was titled Operation Fortitude, only for Scorsese to then do nothing.

=== Religious beliefs ===
Scorsese previously identified as a lapsed Catholic, declaring: "I'm a lapsed Catholic. But I am Roman Catholic; there's no way out of it." In 2016, Scorsese identified himself as a Catholic again, saying: "My way has been, and is, Catholicism. After many years of thinking about other things, dabbling here and there, I am most comfortable as a Catholic. I believe in the tenets of Catholicism."

== Filmography ==
As of 2026, Scorsese has directed 27 full-length narrative films and 16 full-length documentary films.

Key
†	Denotes films that have not yet been released

Directed narrative features
Year	Title	Distributor
1967	Who's That Knocking at My Door	Joseph Brenner Associates
1972	Boxcar Bertha	American International Pictures
1973	Mean Streets	Warner Bros.
1974	Alice Doesn't Live Here Anymore	Warner Bros.
1976	Taxi Driver	Columbia Pictures
1977	New York, New York	United Artists
1980	Raging Bull	United Artists
1982	The King of Comedy	20th Century Fox
1985	After Hours	Warner Bros.
1986	The Color of Money	Buena Vista Distribution
1988	The Last Temptation of Christ	Universal Pictures
1990	Goodfellas	Warner Bros.
1991	Cape Fear	Universal Pictures
1993	The Age of Innocence	Columbia Pictures
1995	Casino	Universal Pictures
1997	Kundun	Buena Vista Distribution
1999	Bringing Out the Dead	Paramount Pictures / Buena Vista International
2002	Gangs of New York	Miramax Films
2004	The Aviator	Warner Bros. Pictures / Miramax Films
2006	The Departed	Warner Bros. Pictures
2010	Shutter Island	Paramount Pictures
2011	Hugo	Paramount Pictures
2013	The Wolf of Wall Street	Paramount Pictures
2016	Silence	Paramount Pictures
2019	The Irishman	Netflix
2023	Killers of the Flower Moon	Paramount Pictures / Apple TV
TBA	What Happens at Night †	Apple Original Films

== Other work ==
=== Film preservation ===
Scorsese had been at the forefront in film preservation and restoration ever since 1990, when he created The Film Foundation, a non-profit film organization which collaborates with film studios to restore prints of old or damaged films. Scorsese launched the organization with Woody Allen, Robert Altman, Francis Ford Coppola, Clint Eastwood, Stanley Kubrick, George Lucas, Sydney Pollack, Robert Redford, and Steven Spielberg, who all sat on the foundation's original board of directors. In 2006, Paul Thomas Anderson, Wes Anderson, Curtis Hanson, Peter Jackson, Ang Lee and Alexander Payne joined them. In 2015, Christopher Nolan also joined the board. Recent members include Spike Lee, Sofia Coppola, Guillermo del Toro, Barry Jenkins, Lynne Ramsay, Joanna Hogg and Kathryn Bigelow.

The foundation has restored more than 800 films from around the world and conducts a free educational curriculum for young people on the language and history of film. Scorsese and the Foundation spearheaded fundraising for the film restoration of Michael Powell, and Emeric Pressburger's The Red Shoes (1948). For his advocacy in film restoration he received the Robert Osborne Award at the 2018 TCM Film Festival. The award was given to Scorsese as "an individual who has significantly contributed to preserving the cultural heritage of classic films".

In November 2020, The Criterion Channel released a 30-minute video titled, 30 Years of The Film Foundation: Martin Scorsese and Ari Aster in Conversation, celebrating the "mission, evolution, and ongoing work of The Film Foundation". Scorsese stated as of 2020, the Foundation has helped restore 850 films.

On April 20, 2024, Scorsese partnered with Seth MacFarlane to showcase Back From the Ink: Restored Animated Shorts at the 2024 TCM Classic Film Festival. Macfarlane and Scorsese funded the restoration, and worked with the UCLA Film and Television Archive and The Film Foundation with Paramount Pictures Archives.

==== The World Cinema Project ====
In 2007, Scorsese established the World Cinema Project with the mission to preserve and present marginalized and infrequently screened films from regions generally ill-equipped to preserve their own cinema history. Scorsese's organization has worked with the Criterion Collection to not only preserve the films but to allow them to be released on DVD and Blu-ray boxsets and on streaming services such as The Criterion Channel. Films in the WCP include Ousmane Sembène's Black Girl (1966), and Djibril Diop Mambéty's Touki Bouki (1973).

The Criterion Collection so far has released four Vol. boxsets on DVD and Blu-ray, titled, Martin Scorsese's World Cinema Project. The first Volume includes 6 titles, Touki Bouki (1973), Redes (1936), A River Called Titas (1973), Dry Summer (1964), Trances (1981) and The Housemaid (1960). The second volume also includes 6 titles, Insiang (1976), Mysterious Object at Noon (2000), Revenge (1989), Limite (1931), Law of the Border (1967), and Taipei Story (1985). The third volume includes 6 titles as well: Lucía (1968), After the Curfew (1954), Pixote (1980), Dos monjes (1934), Soleil Ô (1970), and Downpour (1972). The 6 films included in the fourth set are Sambizanga (1972), Prisioneros de la tierra (1939), Chess of the Wind (1979), Muna Moto (1975), Two Girls on the Street (1939), and Kalpana (1948).

==== The African Film Heritage Project ====
In 2017, Scorsese also introduced The African Film Heritage Project (AFHP), which is a joint initiative between Scorsese's non-profit The Film Foundation, UNESCO, Cineteca di Bologna, and the Pan African Federation of Filmmakers (FEPACI). The project aims to locate and preserve 50 classic African films, some thought lost and others beyond repair, with hopes to make them available to audiences everywhere. In an interview with Cinema Escapist in 2018, Scorsese talked about the ambitious collaboration saying, "Our first goal is to launch and conduct a thorough investigation in film archives and laboratories around the world, in order to locate the best surviving elements—original negatives, we hope—for our first 50 titles." He also stated that "Restoration is always the primary goal, of course, but within the initiative, it's also a starting point of a process that follows through with exhibition and dissemination in Africa and abroad. And of course, our restoration process always includes the creation of preservation elements."

In 2019, the AFHP, announced that they would screen restorations of four African films on their home continent for the first time as part of the 50th anniversary of the Pan African Film Festival of Ouagadougou. The movies in question are Med Hondo's Soleil Ô (1970), Mohammed Lakhdar-Hamina's Chronique des années de braise (1975), Timité Bassori's La Femme au couteau (1969), and Jean-Pierre Dikongue-Pipa's Muna Moto (1975).

=== Film activism ===
Scorsese has mentioned his mentors being such filmmakers as John Cassavetes, Roger Corman, and Michael Powell. In film critic Roger Ebert's book, Scorsese by Ebert, Ebert praised Scorsese for championing and supporting other filmmakers by serving as an executive producer on projects of filmmakers such as Antoine Fuqua, Wim Wenders, Kenneth Lonergan, Stephen Frears, Allison Anders, Spike Lee, and John McNaughton. More recently he has executive produced the films of the Safdie Brothers, Joanna Hogg, Kornél Mundruczó, Josephine Decker, Danielle Lessovitz, Alice Rohrwacher, Jonas Carpignano, Amélie van Elmbt, and Celina Murga. Scorsese has also chosen to name filmmakers throughout the years that he admires such as fellow New York City-based directors Woody Allen and Spike Lee, as well as other artists such as Wes Anderson, Bong Joon-ho, Greta Gerwig, Ari Aster, Kelly Reichardt, Claire Denis, Noah Baumbach, Paul Thomas Anderson, Christopher Nolan, the Coen Brothers, and Kathryn Bigelow.

=== Favorite films ===
Scorsese listed Pickup on South Street as one of his favorite films. The Band Wagon is his favorite musical.

In 2012, Scorsese participated in the Sight and Sound directors' poll. Held every ten years to select the greatest films of all time, contemporary directors were asked to select ten films of their choice. Scorsese, however, picked 12, which are listed below in alphabetical order:

- 2001: A Space Odyssey (US/UK,1968)
- 8½ (Italy, 1963)
- Ashes and Diamonds (Poland, 1958)
- Citizen Kane (US, 1941)
- The Leopard (Italy, 1963)
- Paisà (Italy, 1946)
- The Red Shoes (UK, 1948)
- The River (US, 1951)
- Salvatore Giuliano (Italy, 1962)
- The Searchers (US, 1956)
- Ugetsu (Japan, 1953)
- Vertigo (US, 1958)

Ten years later, Scorsese participated again in the Sight and Sound polls, picking 15 films, the same 12 of the 2012 list, plus the following:

- Diary of a Country Priest (France, 1951)
- Ikiru (Japan, 1952)
- Ordet (Denmark, 1955)

In 1999, after the death of Gene Siskel, Scorsese joined Roger Ebert as the guest co-host for an episode of Siskel & Ebert where they each stated their 10 favorite films of the 1990s. Scorsese's list numerically is:

1. The Horse Thief (China, 1986)
2. The Thin Red Line (US, 1998)
3. A Borrowed Life (Taiwan, 1994)
4. Eyes Wide Shut (US/UK, 1999)
5. Bad Lieutenant (US, 1992)
6. Breaking the Waves (Denmark/UK, 1996)
7. Bottle Rocket (US, 1996)
8. Crash (Canada, 1996)
9. Fargo (US, 1996)
10. Malcolm X (US, 1992) and Heat (US, 1995) (tie)

In 2012, Scorsese recommended 39 foreign films to Colin Levy.

In 2019, Martin Scorsese contributed his list of favorite films to LaCinetek, a streaming platform that compiles film lists from filmmakers worldwide. As a tireless cinephile, Scorsese submitted two lists: one featuring 73 "founding" films and another "alternative list" with 106 films. He also included a letter to Cédric Klapisch, one of LaCinetek's founders, explaining his selections and noting that many filmmakers and films he admires are not included in these lists.

== Legacy and honors ==
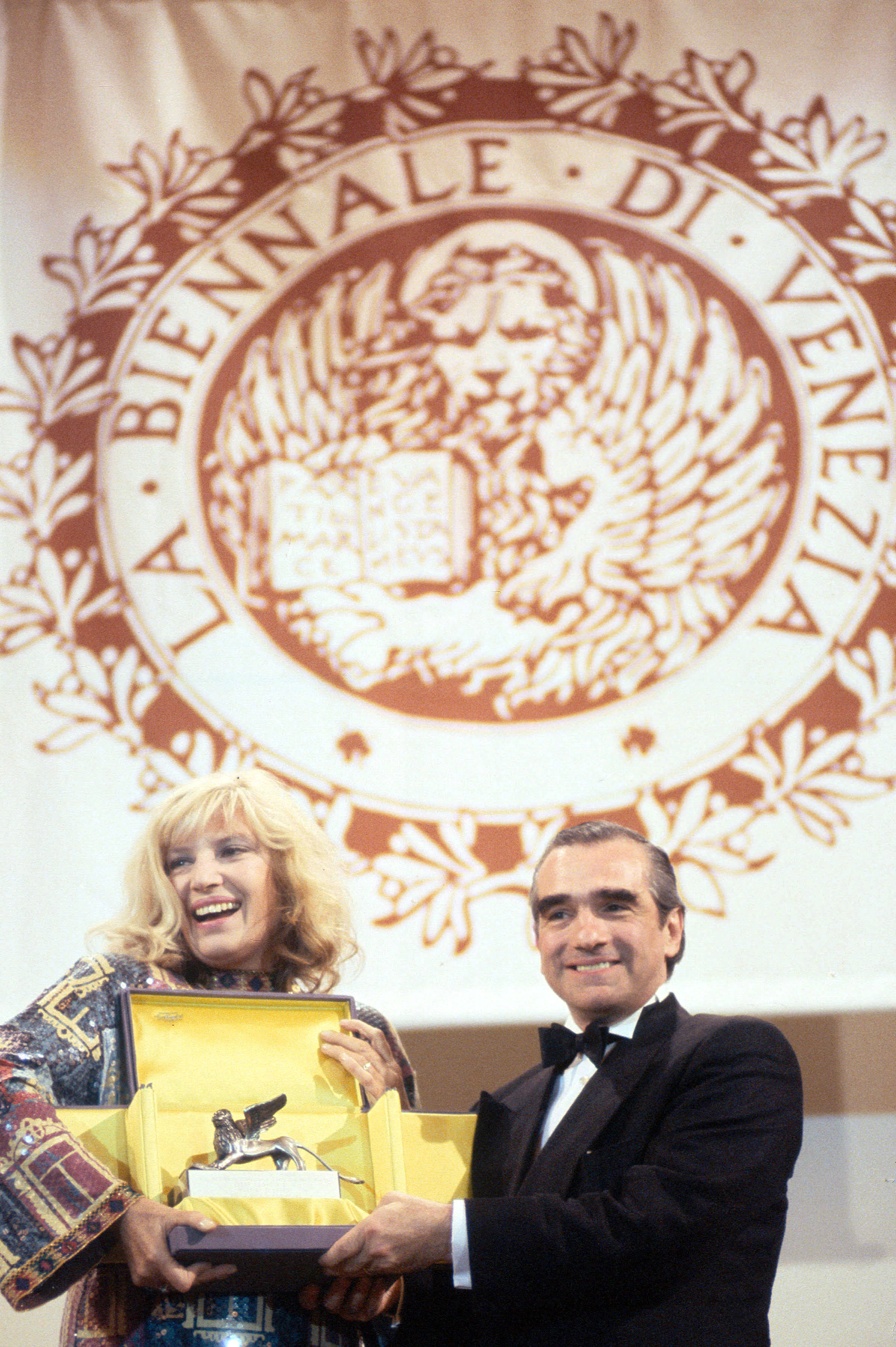
Scorsese receiving the Golden Lion for Lifetime Achievement from actress Monica Vitti at the 1995 Venice Film Festival.

Scorsese's films have been nominated for numerous awards both nationally and internationally, with an Academy Award win for The Departed. In 1991, he received the Golden Plate Award of the American Academy of Achievement. In 1997, Scorsese received the AFI Life Achievement Award. In 1998, the American Film Institute placed three Scorsese films on their list of the greatest American movies: Raging Bull at No. 24, Taxi Driver at No. 47, and Goodfellas at No. 94. For the tenth-anniversary edition of their list, Raging Bull was moved to No. 4, Taxi Driver was moved to No. 52, and Goodfellas was moved to No. 92. In 2001, the American Film Institute placed two Scorsese films on their list of the most "heart-pounding movies" in American cinema: Taxi Driver at No. 22 and Raging Bull at No. 51. At a ceremony in Paris, France, on January 5, 2005, Martin Scorsese was made a Knight of the Order of Arts and Letters (Chevalier des Arts et des Lettres in French) in recognition of his contribution to cinema. On February 8, 2006, at the 48th Annual Grammy Awards, Scorsese was awarded the Grammy Award for Best Long Form Music Video for No Direction Home.

Lynda Myles organized a retrospective of Scorsese's work at the Edinburgh International Film Festival in 1975.

In 2007, Scorsese was listed among Time magazine's 100 Most Influential People in The World. In August 2007, Scorsese was named the second-greatest director of all time in a poll by Total Film magazine, in front of Steven Spielberg and behind Alfred Hitchcock. In 2007, Scorsese was honored by the National Italian American Foundation (N.I.A.F.) at the nonprofit's thirty-second Anniversary Gala. During the ceremony, Scorsese helped launch N.I.A.F.'s Jack Valenti Institute in memory of former foundation board member and past president of the Motion Picture Association of America (M.P.A.A.) Jack Valenti. The Institute provides support to Italian film students in the U.S. Scorsese received his award from Mary Margaret Valenti, Jack Valenti's widow. Certain pieces of Scorsese's film-related material and personal papers are contained in the Wesleyan University Cinema Archives, to which scholars and media experts from around the world may have full access. On September 11, 2007, the Kennedy Center Honors committee, which recognizes career excellence and cultural influence, named Scorsese as one of the honorees for the year. On June 17, 2008, the American Film Institute placed two of Scorsese's films on the AFI's 10 Top 10 list: Raging Bull at number one for the Sports genre and Goodfellas at number two for the Gangster genre. In 2013, the staff of Entertainment Weekly voted Mean Streets the seventh greatest film ever made.

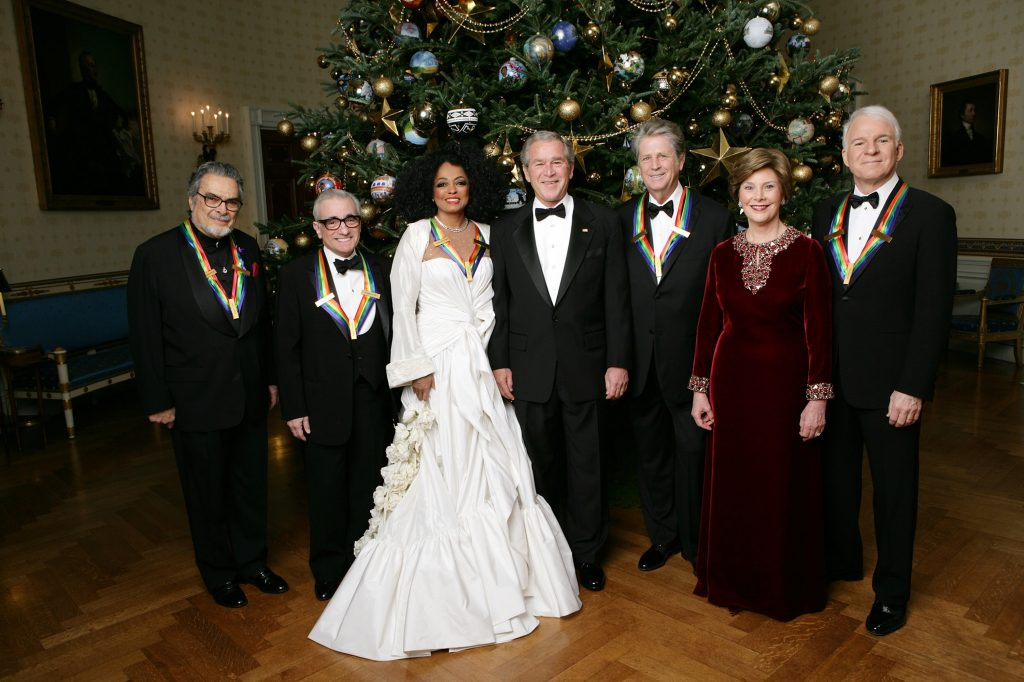
Leon Fleisher, Scorsese (second from left), Diana Ross, Brian Wilson and Steve Martin with President George W. Bush and First Lady Laura Bush in 2007

On January 17, 2010, at the 67th Golden Globe Awards, Scorsese was the recipient of the Golden Globe Cecil B. DeMille Award. On September 18, 2011, at the 63rd Primetime Emmy Awards, Scorsese won the Primetime Emmy Award for Outstanding Directing for a Drama Series for his work on the series premiere of Boardwalk Empire. In 2011, Scorsese received an honorary doctorate from the National Film School in Lodz. At the awards ceremony he said, "I feel like I'm a part of this school and that I attended it," paying tribute to the films of Wajda, Munk, Has, Polanski and Skolimowski. King Missile wrote "Martin Scorsese" in his honor. On February 12, 2012, at the 65th British Academy Film Awards, Scorsese was the recipient of the BAFTA Academy Fellowship Award.

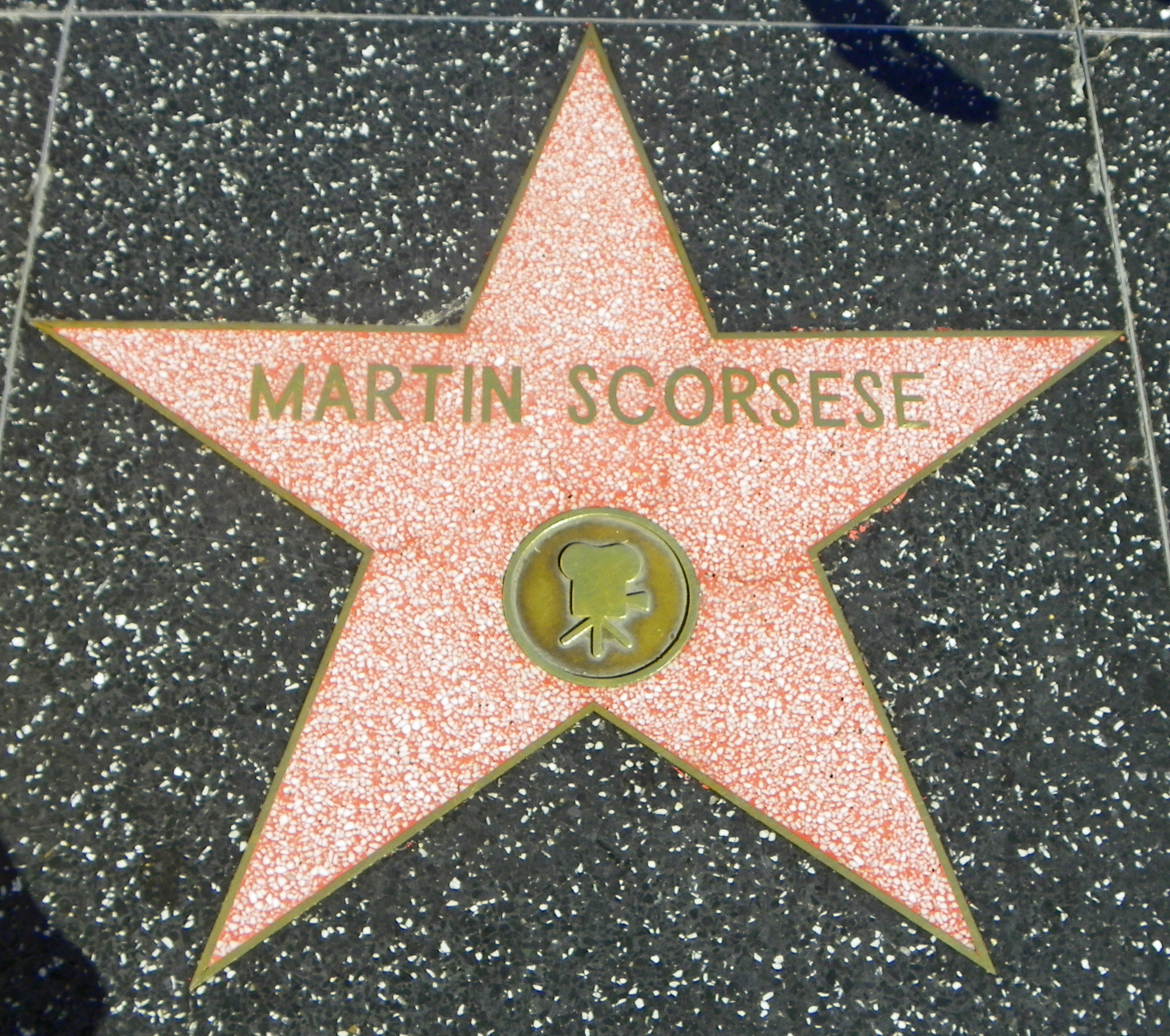
Scorsese's star on the Hollywood Walk of Fame

On September 16, 2012, Scorsese won two Emmy Awards for Outstanding Directing for Nonfiction Programming and Outstanding Nonfiction Special for his work on the documentary George Harrison: Living in the Material World. In 2013, the National Endowment for the Humanities selected Scorsese for the Jefferson Lecture, the U.S. federal government's highest honor for achievement in the humanities. He was the first filmmaker chosen for the honor. His lecture, delivered on April 1, 2013, at the John F. Kennedy Center for the Performing Arts, was titled "Persistence of Vision: Reading the Language of Cinema". Scorsese was appointed to the Polish Gold Medal for Merit to Culture – Gloria Artis on April 11, 2017, in recognition of his contribution to Polish cinema. He received the Medal on May 29, 2025.

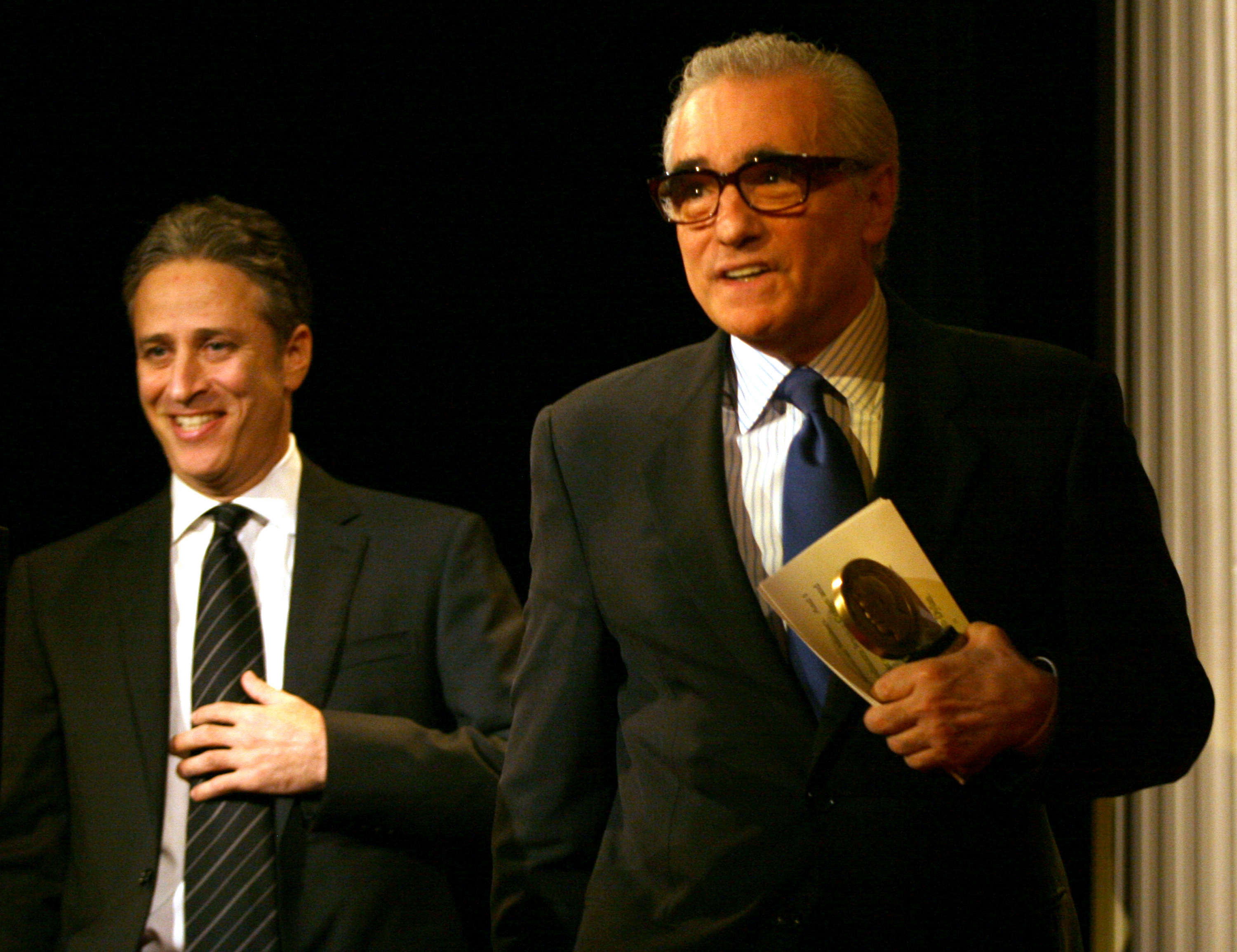
Jon Stewart with Scorsese at the Peabody Awards in 2006

Scorsese has also garnered favorable responses from numerous film giants including Ingmar Bergman, Frank Capra, Jean-Luc Godard, Werner Herzog, Elia Kazan, Akira Kurosawa, David Lean, Michael Powell, Satyajit Ray, and François Truffaut. He was elected to the American Philosophical Society in 2008. He was awarded an Honorary Doctorate from the University of Oxford on June 20, 2018. As of 2021, four of Scorsese's films (Mean Streets, Taxi Driver, Raging Bull, and Goodfellas) have been selected by the Library of Congress for preservation in the National Film Registry for being "culturally, historically, or aesthetically significant". In commenting on Scorsese's 2019 film The Irishman, Guillermo del Toro cited Scorsese's ability as a director for the depiction of character development comparable to the films of "Renoir, Bresson, Bergman, Oliveira or Kurosawa". Sam Mendes, in his acceptance speech after winning the 2020 Golden Globe Award for Best Director for 1917, praised Scorsese's contribution to cinema, stating, "There's not one director in this room, not one director in the world, that is not in the shadow of Martin Scorsese... I just have to say that." Bong Joon-ho, in his acceptance speech for the 2020 Academy Award for Best Director for Parasite, said, "When I was young and studying cinema, there was a saying that I carved deep into my heart, which is, the most personal is the most creative." He then said that this quote had come from Scorsese, which prompted the audience to give Scorsese a standing ovation.

In 2021, lifelong friend George Lucas and his wife Mellody Hobson through the Hobson/Lucas Family Foundation made a donation to NYU to establish the Martin Scorsese Institute of Global Cinematic Arts.

On October 17, 2025, Apple TV premiered a five-part documentary series about Scorsese titled Mr. Scorsese, directed by Rebecca Miller.

== Accolades ==
Accolades received by Scorsese's features
Year	Title	Academy Awards		BAFTA Awards		Golden Globe Awards	
Year	Title	Nominations	Wins	Nominations	Wins	Nominations	Wins
1974	Alice Doesn't Live Here Anymore	3	1	7	4	2	
1976	Taxi Driver	4		7	3	2	
1977	New York, New York			2		4	
1980	Raging Bull	8	2	4	2	7	1
1983	The King of Comedy			4	1		
1985	After Hours			1		1	
1986	The Color of Money	4	1			2	
1988	The Last Temptation of Christ	1				2	
1990	Goodfellas	6	1	7	5	5	
1991	Cape Fear	2		2		2	
1993	The Age of Innocence	5	1	4	1	4	1
1995	Casino	1				2	1
1997	Kundun	4				1	
2002	Gangs of New York	10		12	1	5	2
2004	The Aviator	11	5	14	4	6	3
2006	The Departed	5	4	6		6	1
2011	Hugo	11	5	9	2	3	1
2013	The Wolf of Wall Street	5		4		2	1
2016	Silence	1					
2019	The Irishman	10		10		5	
2023	Killers of the Flower Moon	10		9		7	1
Total		101	20	102	23	68	11

Directed Academy Award performances

Under Scorsese's direction, these actors have received Academy Award wins and nominations for their performances in their respective roles.

Year	Performer	Film	Result
Academy Award for Best Actor
1976	Robert De Niro	Taxi Driver	Nominated
1980	Robert De Niro	Raging Bull	Won
1986	Paul Newman	The Color of Money	Won
1991	Robert De Niro	Cape Fear	Nominated
2002	Daniel Day-Lewis	Gangs of New York	Nominated
2004	Leonardo DiCaprio	The Aviator	Nominated
2013	Leonardo DiCaprio	The Wolf of Wall Street	Nominated
Academy Award for Best Actress
1974	Ellen Burstyn	Alice Doesn't Live Here Anymore	Won
1995	Sharon Stone	Casino	Nominated
2023	Lily Gladstone	Killers of the Flower Moon	Nominated
Academy Award for Best Supporting Actor
1980	Joe Pesci	Raging Bull	Nominated
1990	Joe Pesci	Goodfellas	Won
2004	Alan Alda	The Aviator	Nominated
2006	Mark Wahlberg	The Departed	Nominated
2013	Jonah Hill	The Wolf of Wall Street	Nominated
2019	Al Pacino	The Irishman	Nominated
2019	Joe Pesci	The Irishman	Nominated
2023	Robert De Niro	Killers of the Flower Moon	Nominated
Academy Award for Best Supporting Actress
1974	Diane Ladd	Alice Doesn't Live Here Anymore	Nominated
1976	Jodie Foster	Taxi Driver	Nominated
1980	Cathy Moriarty	Raging Bull	Nominated
1986	Mary Elizabeth Mastrantonio	The Color of Money	Nominated
1990	Lorraine Bracco	Goodfellas	Nominated
1991	Juliette Lewis	Cape Fear	Nominated
1993	Winona Ryder	The Age of Innocence	Nominated
2004	Cate Blanchett	The Aviator	Won

== See also ==
- Martin Scorsese's unrealized projects

== Works cited ==
- Wilson, Michael (2011). Scorsese On Scorsese. Cahiers du Cinéma. ISBN 9782866427023.
