= The Story of Film: An Odyssey =

2011 documentary by Mark Cousins

- Film poster
- Genre: Documentary
- Based on: The Story of Film by Mark Cousins
- Written by: Mark Cousins
- Directed by: Mark Cousins
- Narrated by: Mark Cousins
- Country of origin: United Kingdom
- Original language: English
- No. of episodes: 15

Production
- Producer: John Archer
- Editor: Timo Langer
- Running time: 915 minutes
- Production company: Hopscotch Films

Original release
- Network: More4
- Release: 3 September – 10 December 2011

The Story of Film: An Odyssey is a 2011 British documentary film about the history of film, presented on television in 15 one-hour chapters with a total length of over 900 minutes. It was directed and narrated by Mark Cousins, a film critic from Northern Ireland, based on his 2004 book The Story of Film.

The series was broadcast in September 2011 on More4, the digital television service of British broadcaster Channel 4. The Story of Film was featured in its entirety at the 2011 Toronto International Film Festival, and at the 2012 Istanbul International Film Festival. It was exhibited at the Museum of Modern Art in New York City in February 2012. It was broadcast in the United States on Turner Classic Movies, beginning in September 2013.

The Telegraph headlined the series' initial broadcast in September 2011 as the "cinematic event of the year", describing it as "visually ensnaring and intellectually lithe, it’s at once a love letter to cinema, an unmissable masterclass, and a radical rewriting of movie history." An Irish Times writer called the programme a "landmark" (albeit a "bizarrely underpromoted" one). The programme won a Peabody Award in 2013 "for its inclusive, uniquely annotated survey of world cinema history."

In February 2012, A. O. Scott of The New York Times described Cousins' film as "a semester-long film studies survey course compressed into 15 brisk, sometimes contentious hours" that "stands as an invigorated compendium of conventional wisdom." Contrasting the project with its "important precursor (and also, perhaps, an implicit interlocutor)", Jean-Luc Godard’s Histoire(s) du cinéma, Scott commended Cousins' film as "the place from which all future revisionism must start".

== Episodes ==
1. Birth of the Cinema
2. The Hollywood Dream
3. The Golden Age of World Cinema
4. The Arrival of Sound
5. Post-War Cinema
6. Sex & Melodrama
7. European New Wave
8. New Directors, New Form
9. American Cinema of the 70s
10. Movies Change the World
11. The Arrival of Multiplexes and Asian Mainstream
12. Fight the Power
13. New Boundaries
14. New American Independents & The Digital Revolution
15. Cinema Today and the Future

Each episode section below lists the film clips that are featured in that episode.

=== Episode 1: "Birth of the Cinema" ===
Introduction

- Saving Private Ryan (1998) dir. Steven Spielberg
- Three Colors: Blue (1993) dir. Krzysztof Kieślowski
- Casablanca (1942) dir. Michael Curtiz
- The Record of a Tenement Gentleman (1947) dir. Yasujirō Ozu
- Odd Man Out (1947) dir. Carol Reed
- Two or Three Things I Know About Her (1967) dir. Jean-Luc Godard
- Taxi Driver (1976) dir. Martin Scorsese
- The French Connection (1971) dir. William Friedkin

1895–1918: The World Discovers a New Art Form or Birth of the Cinema

- Traffic Crossing Leeds Bridge (1888) dir. Louis Le Prince
- The Kiss (1896 film) (a.k.a. May Irwin Kiss)(1896) dir. William Heise
- Workers Leaving the Lumière Factory (1895) dir. Louis Lumière
- Arrival of a Train at La Ciotat (1896) dir. Louis Lumière
- Annabelle Serpentine Dance (1894-1896 ?) dir. William Kennedy Dickson or William Heise
- Sandow (1894) dir. William Kennedy Dickson
- What Happened on Twenty-third Street, New York City (1901) dir. George S. Fleming and Edwin S. Porter
- Cendrillon (1899) dir. Georges Méliès
- Le voyage dans la lune (1902) dir. Georges Méliès
- La lune à un mètre (1898) dir. Georges Méliès
- The Kiss in the Tunnel (1899) dir. George Albert Smith
- Shoah (1985) dir. Claude Lanzmann
- 2001: A Space Odyssey (1968) dir. Stanley Kubrick
- The Sick Kitten (1903) dir. George Albert Smith
- October: Ten Days That Shook the World(1928) dir. Sergei Eisenstein
- Once Upon a Time in the West (1968) dir. Sergio Leone
- The Corbett-Fitzsimmons Fight (1897) dir. Enoch J. Rector

1903–1918: The Thrill Becomes Story or The Hollywood Dream

- Life of an American Fireman (1903) dir. Edwin S. Porter
- Sherlock Jr. (1924) dir. Buster Keaton
- The Horse that Bolted (1907) dir. Charles Pathé
- The Assassination of the Duke of Guise (a.k.a. The Assassination of the Duc de Guise) (1908) dir. Charles le Bargy and André Calmettes
- Vivre sa vie (1962) dir. Jean-Luc Godard
- Those Awful Hats (1909) dir. D. W. Griffith
- The Mended Lute (1909) dir. D. W. Griffith
- The Abyss (1910) dir. Urban Gad
- Stage Struck (1925) dir. Allan Dwan
- The Mysterious X (1914) dir. Benjamin Christensen
- Häxan (1922) dir. Benjamin Christensen
- Ingeborg Holm (1913) dir. Victor Sjöström
- The Phantom Carriage (1921) dir. Victor Sjöström
- Shanghai Express (1932) dir. Josef von Sternberg
- The Story of the Kelly Gang (1906) dir. Charles Tait
- The Squaw Man (1914) dir. Oscar Apfel and Cecil B. DeMille
- The Empire Strikes Back (1980) dir. Irvin Kershner
- Falling Leaves (1912) dir. Alice Guy-Blaché
- Suspense (1913) dir. Phillips Smalley and Lois Weber
- The Wind (1928) dir. Victor Sjöström
- Rescued from an Eagle's Nest (1908) dir. J. Searle Dawley
- The House with Closed Shutters (1910) dir. D. W. Griffith
- Way Down East (1920) dir. D. W. Griffith
- Orphans of the Storm (1921) dir. D. W. Griffith
- The Birth of a Nation (1915) dir. D. W. Griffith
- Rebirth of a Nation (2007) dir. DJ Spooky
- Cabiria (1914) dir. Giovanni Pastrone
- Intolerance (1916) dir. D. W. Griffith
- Souls on the Road (a.k.a. Rojo No Reikan) (1921) dir. Minoru Murata

=== Episode 2: "The Hollywood Dream" ===
1918–1928: The Triumph of American Film...

- Citizen Kane (1941) dir. Orson Welles
- The Thief of Bagdad (1924) dir. Raoul Walsh
- Desire (1936) dir. Frank Borzage
- Gone with the Wind (1939) dir. Victor Fleming
- Gold Diggers of 1933 (1933) dir. Mervyn LeRoy
- Singin' in the Rain (1952) dir. Gene Kelly and Stanley Donen
- The Maltese Falcon (1941) dir. John Huston
- The Scarlet Empress (1934) dir. Josef von Sternberg
- The Cameraman (1928) dir. Edward Sedgwick and Buster Keaton
- One Week (1920) dir. Edward F. Cline and Buster Keaton
- Sherlock Jr. (1924) (introduced in Episode 1) dir. Buster Keaton
- Three Ages (1923) dir. Buster Keaton and Edward F. Cline
- Buster Keaton Rides Again (1965) dir. John Spotton
- The General (1926) dir. Clyde Bruckman and Buster Keaton
- Divine Intervention (2002) dir. Elia Suleiman
- Limelight (1952) dir. Charlie Chaplin
- City Lights (1931) dir. Charlie Chaplin
- The Kid (1921) dir. Charlie Chaplin
- Bad Timing (1980) dir. Nicolas Roeg
- The Great Dictator (1940) dir. Charlie Chaplin
- Monsieur Hulot's Holiday (1953) dir. Jacques Tati
- Toto in Color (1953) dir. Steno
- Awaara (1951) dir. Raj Kapoor
- Sunset Boulevard (1950) dir. Billy Wilder
- Some Like It Hot (1959) dir. Billy Wilder
- Luke's Movie Muddle (1916) dir. Hal Roach
- Haunted Spooks (1920) dir. Alfred J. Goulding and Hal Roach
- Never Weaken (1921) dir. Fred C. Newmeyer and Sam Taylor
- Safety Last! (1923) dir. Fred C. Newmeyer and Sam Taylor
- I Flunked, But... (1930) dir. Yasujirō Ozu

...And the First of its Rebels

- Nanook of the North (1922) dir. Robert Flaherty
- The House Is Black (1963) dir. Forough Farrokhzad
- Sans Soleil (1983) dir. Chris Marker
- The Not Dead (2007) dir. Brian Hill
- The Perfect Human (1967) (shown as part of The Five Obstructions) dir. Jørgen Leth
- The Five Obstructions (2003) dir. Lars von Trier and Jørgen Leth
- Blind Husbands (1919) dir. Erich von Stroheim
- The Lost Squadron (1932) dir. George Archainbaud and Paul Sloane
- Greed (1924) dir. Erich von Stroheim
- Stroheim in Vienna (1948)
- Queen Kelly (1929) (shown as part of Sunset Boulevard) dir. Erich von Stroheim
- The Crowd (1928) dir. King Vidor
- The Apartment (1960) dir. Billy Wilder
- The Trial (1962) dir. Orson Welles
- Aelita: Queen of Mars (1924) dir. Yakov Protazanov
- Posle Smerti (1915) dir. Yevgeni Bauer
- The Passion of Joan of Arc (1928) dir. Carl Theodor Dreyer
- Ordet (1955) dir. Carl Theodor Dreyer
- The President (1919) dir. Carl Theodor Dreyer
- Vampyr (1932) dir. Carl Theodor Dreyer
- Gertrud (1964) dir. Carl Theodor Dreyer
- Dogville (2003) dir. Lars von Trier
- Vivre sa vie (1962) (introduced in Episode 1) dir. Jean-Luc Godard

=== Episode 3: "The Golden Age of World Cinema" ===
1918–1932: The Great Rebel Filmmakers Around the World

- The Thief of Bagdad (1924) (introduced in Episode 2) dir. Raoul Walsh
- The Passion of Joan of Arc (1928) (introduced in Episode 2) dir. Carl Theodor Dreyer
- Robert and Bertram (1915) dir. Max Mack
- The Oyster Princess (1919) dir. Ernst Lubitsch
- The Mountain Cat (1921) dir. Ernst Lubitsch
- The Marriage Circle (1924) dir. Ernst Lubitsch
- La Roue (1923) dir. Abel Gance
- Napoléon (1927) dir. Abel Gance
- The Cabinet of Dr. Caligari (1920) dir. Robert Wiene
- The Tell-Tale Heart (1928) dir. Charles Klein
- The Lodger (1927) dir. Alfred Hitchcock
- A Page of Madness (1926) dir. Teinosuke Kinugasa
- Metropolis (1927) dir. Fritz Lang
- The Crowd (1928) (introduced in Episode 2) dir. King Vidor
- Sunrise: A Song of Two Humans (1927) dir. F. W. Murnau
- Opus 1 (1921) dir. Walter Ruttmann
- Entr'acte (1924) dir. René Clair
- Rien que les heures (1926) dir. Alberto Cavalcanti
- Spellbound (1945) dir. Alfred Hitchcock
- Un Chien Andalou (1929) dir. Luis Buñuel
- Blue Velvet (1986) dir. David Lynch
- L'Age d'Or (1930) dir. Luis Buñuel
- Kino-Pravda n. 19 (1924) dir. Dziga Vertov
- Glumov's Diary (1923) dir. Sergei Eisenstein
- Battleship Potemkin (1925) dir. Sergei Eisenstein
- The Untouchables (1987) dir. Brian De Palma
- Arsenal (1929) dir. Alexander Dovzhenko
- Earth (1930) dir. Alexander Dovzhenko
- I Was Born, But... (1932) dir. Yasujirō Ozu
- Tokyo Story (1953) dir. Yasujirō Ozu
- Jeanne Dielman, 23 quai du Commerce, 1080 Bruxelles (1975) dir. Chantal Akerman
- The Record of a Tenement Gentleman (1947) (introduced in Episode 1) dir. Yasujirō Ozu
- Osaka Elegy (1936) dir. Kenji Mizoguchi
- Citizen Kane (1941) (introduced in Episode 2) dir. Orson Welles
- Chikamatsu Monogatari (1954) dir. Kenji Mizoguchi
- Mildred Pierce (1945) dir. Michael Curtiz
- Romance of the West Chamber (1927) dir. Hou Yao and Minwei Li
- Scenes of City Life (1935) dir. Yuan Muzhi
- The Goddess (1934) dir. Wu Yonggang
- Center Stage (1991) dir. Stanley Kwan
- New Women (1935) dir. Cai Chusheng

=== Episode 4: "The Arrival of Sound" ===
The 1930s: The Great American Movie Genres...

- Confessions of a Co-Ed (1931) dir. Dudley Murphy
- Love Me Tonight (1932) dir. Rouben Mamoulian
- The Golem: How He Came into the World(1920) dir. Carl Boese and Paul Wegener
- Frankenstein (1931) dir. James Whale
- Eyes Without a Face (1960) dir. Georges Franju
- Audition (1999) dir. Takashi Miike
- The Public Enemy (1931) dir. William A. Wellman
- Scarface (1932) dir. Howard Hawks and Richard Rosson
- Scarface (1983) dir. Brian De Palma
- Seven Samurai (1954) dir. Akira Kurosawa
- Once Upon a Time in America (1984) dir. Sergio Leone
- The Iron Horse (1924) dir. John Ford
- My Darling Clementine (1946) dir. John Ford
- Twentieth Century (1934) dir. Howard Hawks
- Bringing Up Baby (1938) dir. Howard Hawks
- The Men Who Made the Movies: Howard Hawks (1973) dir. Richard Schickel
- Gold Diggers of 1933 (1933) (introduced in Episode 1) dir. Mervyn LeRoy
- Gertie the Dinosaur (1914) dir. Winsor McCay
- The Adventures of Prince Achmed (1926) dir. Lotte Reiniger
- Plane Crazy (1928) dir. Walt Disney and Ub Iwerks
- Snow White and the Seven Dwarfs (1937) dir. David Hand, William Cottrell, Wilfred Jackson, Larry Morey, Perce Pearce, and Ben Sharpsteen
- One Hundred and One Dalmatians (1961) dir. Clyde Geronimi, Hamilton Luske, and Wolfgang Reitherman

...And the Brilliance of European Film

- The Blood of a Poet (1931) dir. Jean Cocteau
- Inception (2010) dir. Christopher Nolan
- Zéro de conduite (1933) dir. Jean Vigo
- If.... (1968) dir. Lindsay Anderson
- L'Atalante (1934) dir. Jean Vigo
- Le Quai des brumes (1938) dir. Marcel Carné
- Les Enfants du Paradis (1945) dir. Marcel Carné
- La Règle du jeu (1939) (a.k.a. The Rules of the Game) dir. Jean Renoir
- La Grande Illusion (1937) dir. Jean Renoir
- Limite (1931) dir. Mário Peixoto
- The Adventures of a Good Citizen (1937) dir. Stefan Themerson
- Two Men and a Wardrobe (1958) dir. Roman Polanski
- Das Blaue Licht (1932) dir. Leni Riefenstahl
- Triumph of the Will (1935) dir. Leni Riefenstahl
- Behind the Scenes of the Filming of the Olympic Games (1937) dir. Leni Riefenstahl
- Olympia Part Two: Festival of Beauty (1938) dir. Leni Riefenstahl
- Tiefland (1954) dir. Leni Riefenstahl
- The Wonderful, Horrible Life of Leni Riefenstahl(1993) dir. Ray Müller
- Vertigo (1958) dir. Alfred Hitchcock
- Saboteur (1942) dir. Alfred Hitchcock
- Sabotage (1936) dir. Alfred Hitchcock
- The 39 Steps (1935) dir. Alfred Hitchcock
- Marnie (1964) dir. Alfred Hitchcock
- Ninotchka (1939) dir. Ernst Lubitsch
- The Wizard of Oz (1939) dir. Victor Fleming
- Gone with the Wind (1939) (introduced in Episode 2) dir. Victor Fleming

=== Episode 5: "Post-War Cinema" ===
1939–1952: The Devastation of War...and a New Movie Language

- Rome, Open City (1945) dir. Roberto Rossellini
- Stagecoach (1939) dir. John Ford
- Directed by John Ford (1971) dir. Peter Bogdanovich
- Osaka Elegy (1936) (introduced in Episode 3) dir. Kenji Mizoguchi
- Flesh and the Devil (1926) dir. Clarence Brown
- Follow the Boys (1944) dir. A. Edward Sutherland
- Citizen Kane (1941) (introduced in Episode 2) dir. Orson Welles
- Me and Orson Welles (2008) dir. Richard Linklater
- Chimes at Midnight (1965) dir. Orson Welles
- Cabiria (1914) (introduced in Episode 1) dir. Giovanni Pastrone
- Intolerance (1916) (introduced in Episode 1) dir. D. W. Griffith
- The General (1926) (introduced in Episode 2) dir. Clyde Bruckman and Buster Keaton
- The Maltese Falcon (1941) (introduced in Episode 2) dir. John Huston
- The Best Years of Our Lives (1946) dir. William Wyler
- Code Unknown (2000) dir. Michael Haneke
- Sátántangó (1994) dir. Béla Tarr
- How to Marry a Millionaire (1953) dir. Jean Negulesco
- Un Homme et une Femme (1966) dir. Claude Lelouch
- Heat (1995) dir. Michael Mann
- Raging Bull (1980) dir. Martin Scorsese
- Bicycle Thieves (1948) dir. Vittorio De Sica
- Pin Up Girl (1944) dir. H. Bruce Humberstone
- Double Indemnity (1944) dir. Billy Wilder
- Portrait of a 66% Perfect Man: Billy Wilder(1982) dir. Annie Tresgot
- The Testament of Dr. Mabuse (1933) dir. Fritz Lang
- The Big Sleep (1946) dir. Howard Hawks
- Rio Bravo (1959) dir. Howard Hawks
- The Empire Strikes Back (1980) (introduced in Episode 1) dir. Irvin Kershner
- Out of the Past (1947) dir. Jacques Tourneur
- The Hitch-Hiker (1953) dir. Ida Lupino
- Little Caesar (1931) dir. Mervyn LeRoy
- Le Quai des brumes (1938) (introduced in Episode 4) dir. Marcel Carné
- La Chienne (1931) dir. Jean Renoir
- Scarlet Street (1945) dir. Fritz Lang
- American Cinema: Film Noir (1995) dir. Alain Klarer
- Gun Crazy (1950) dir. Joseph H. Lewis
- Bonnie and Clyde (1967) dir. Arthur Penn
- L.A. Confidential (1997) dir. Curtis Hanson
- Blade Runner (1982) dir. Ridley Scott
- The Dark Knight (2008) dir. Christopher Nolan
- Siva (1989) dir. Ram Gopal Varma
- Titanic (1997) dir. James Cameron
- 71st Academy Awards (1999) dir. Louis J. Horvitz
- An American in Paris (1951) dir. Vincente Minnelli
- The Red Shoes (1948) dir. Michael Powell and Emeric Pressburger
- Singin' in the Rain (1952) (introduced in Episode 2) dir. Gene Kelly and Stanley Donen
- Flying Down to Rio (1933) dir. Thornton Freeland
- Gold Diggers of 1933 (1933) (introduced in Episode 2) dir. Mervyn LeRoy
- Indiscreet (1958) dir. Stanley Donen
- Two for the Road (1967) dir. Stanley Donen
- A Matter of Life and Death (1946) dir. Michael Powell and Emeric Pressburger
- Post Haste (1933) dir. Humphrey Jennings
- Listen to Britain (1942) dir. Humphrey Jennings and Stewart McAllister
- The Third Man (1949) dir. Carol Reed
- The True Glory (1945) dir. Carol Reed and Garson Kanin
- Taxi Driver (1976) (introduced in Episode 1) dir. Martin Scorsese

=== Episode 6: "Sex & Melodrama" ===
1953–1957: The Swollen Story: World Cinema Bursting at the Seams

- Rebel Without a Cause (1955) dir. Nicholas Ray
- Cairo Station (1958) dir. Youssef Chahine
- Paper Flowers (1959) dir. Guru Dutt
- Raja Harishchandra (1913) dir. Dadasaheb Phalke
- Sant Tukaram (1936) dir. Vishnupant Govind Damle and Sheikh Fattelal
- Pather Panchali (1955) dir. Satyajit Ray
- Devi (1960) dir. Satyajit Ray
- Mother India (1957) dir. Mehboob Khan
- Two Stage Sisters (1964) dir. Xie Jin
- Ikiru (1952) dir. Akira Kurosawa
- Stray Dog (1949) dir. Akira Kurosawa
- Seven Samurai (1954) (introduced in Episode 4) dir. Akira Kurosawa
- Throne of Blood (1957) dir. Akira Kurosawa
- The Godfather (1972) dir. Francis Ford Coppola
- The Magnificent Seven (1960) dir. John Sturges
- Limite (1931) (introduced in Episode 4) dir. Mário Peixoto
- Rio 40 Graus (a.k.a. Rio 100 Degrees F.) (1955) dir. Nelson Pereira dos Santos
- The Life of General Villa (1914) dir. Christy Cabanne
- Doña Bárbara (1943) dir. Fernando de Fuentes and Miguel M. Delgado
- The Wild Bunch (1969) dir. Sam Peckinpah
- La perla (1947) dir. Emilio Fernández
- Los Olvidados (1950) dir. Luis Buñuel
- All That Heaven Allows (1955) dir. Douglas Sirk
- I'm a Stranger Here Myself (1975) dir. David Helpern
- Johnny Guitar (1954) dir. Nicholas Ray
- Fireworks (1947) dir. Kenneth Anger
- Scorpio Rising (1964) dir. Kenneth Anger
- Marty (television show) (1953) dir. Delbert Mann
- Marty (1955) dir. Delbert Mann
- On the Waterfront (1954) dir. Elia Kazan
- Red River (1948) dir. Howard Hawks and Arthur Rosson
- Touch of Evil (1958) dir. Orson Welles
- The Searchers (1956) dir. John Ford
- Vertigo (1958) (introduced in Episode 4) dir. Alfred Hitchcock
- Rio Bravo (1959) (introduced in Episode 5) dir. Howard Hawks
- Great Expectations (1946) dir. David Lean
- Lawrence of Arabia (1962) dir. David Lean
- O Dreamland (1953) dir. Lindsay Anderson
- Battleship Potemkin (1925) (introduced in Episode 3) dir. Sergei Eisenstein
- ...And God Created Woman (1956) dir. Roger Vadim

=== Episode 7: "European New Wave" ===
1957–1964: The Shock of the New: Modern Filmmaking in Western Europe.

- Workers Leaving the Lumière Factory (1895) (introduced in Episode 1) dir. Louis Lumière
- Summer with Monika (1953) dir. Ingmar Bergman
- The Seventh Seal (1957) dir. Ingmar Bergman
- Winter Light (1963) dir. Ingmar Bergman
- Persona (1966) dir. Ingmar Bergman
- Pickpocket (1959) dir. Robert Bresson
- Au hasard Balthazar (1966) dir. Robert Bresson
- Taxi Driver (1976) (introduced in Episode 1) dir. Martin Scorsese
- Ratcatcher (1999) dir. Lynne Ramsay
- Monsieur Hulot's Holiday (1953) (introduced in Episode 2) dir. Jacques Tati
- Mon Oncle (1956) dir. Jacques Tati
- Fellini's Casanova (1976) dir. Federico Fellini
- Nights of Cabiria (1957) dir. Federico Fellini
- 8½ (1963) dir. Federico Fellini
- Stardust Memories (1980) dir. Woody Allen
- Cléo from 5 to 7 (1962) dir. Agnès Varda
- Last Year at Marienbad (1961) dir. Alain Resnais
- The 400 Blows (1959) dir. François Truffaut
- À bout de souffle (1959) dir. Jean-Luc Godard
- Life of an American Fireman (1903) (introduced in Episode 1) dir. Edwin S. Porter
- Arsenal (1929) (introduced in Episode 3) dir. Alexander Dovzhenko
- Une femme mariée (1964) dir. Jean-Luc Godard
- American Gigolo (1980) dir. Paul Schrader
- Accattone (1961) dir. Pier Paolo Pasolini
- The Gospel According to St. Matthew (1964) dir. Pier Paolo Pasolini
- The Passion of Joan of Arc (1928) (introduced in Episode 2) dir. Carl Theodor Dreyer
- A Fistful of Dollars (1964) dir. Sergio Leone
- Once Upon a Time in the West (1968) (introduced in Episode 1) dir. Sergio Leone
- Johnny Guitar (1954) (introduced in Episode 6) dir. Nicholas Ray
- Senso (1954) dir. Luchino Visconti
- Rocco and His Brothers (1960) dir. Luchino Visconti
- L'eclisse (1962) dir. Michelangelo Antonioni
- The Passenger (1975) dir. Michelangelo Antonioni
- The Travelling Players (1975) dir. Theodoros Angelopoulos
- The Wheelchair (1960) dir. Marco Ferreri
- What Have I Done to Deserve This? (1984) dir. Pedro Almodóvar
- Viridiana (1961) dir. Luis Buñuel
- I Am Curious (Yellow) (1967) dir. Vilgot Sjöman
- La Maman et la Putain (1973) dir. Jean Eustache

=== Episode 8: "New Directors, New Form" ===
1965–1969: New Waves: Sweep Around the World.

- Ashes and Diamonds (1958) dir. Andrzej Wajda
- Two Men and a Wardrobe (1958) (introduced in Episode 4) dir. Roman Polanski
- Hamlet (1948) dir. Laurence Olivier
- Knife in the Water (1962) dir. Roman Polanski
- The Fearless Vampire Killers (1967) dir. Roman Polanski
- The Hand (1965) dir. Jiří Trnka
- The Fireman's Ball (1967) dir. Miloš Forman
- Daisies (1966) dir. Věra Chytilová
- The Red and the White (1968) dir. Miklós Jancsó
- Une journée d'Andrei Arsenevitch (2000) dir. Chris Marker
- Andrei Rublev (1966) dir. Andrei Tarkovsky
- The Mirror (1975) dir. Andrei Tarkovsky
- Stalker (1979) dir. Andrei Tarkovsky
- Nostalghia (1983) dir. Andrei Tarkovsky
- Shadows of our Forgotten Ancestors (1965) dir. Sergei Parajanov
- Andrei Tarkovsky & Sergei Parajanov – Islands(1988) dir. Levon Grigoryan
- Boy (1969) dir. Nagisa Oshima
- In the Realm of the Senses (1976) dir. Nagisa Oshima
- Love and Crime (1969) dir. Teruo Ishii
- Shohei Imamura: The Free Thinker (1995) dir. Paulo Rocha (film director)
- The Insect Woman (1963) dir. Shōhei Imamura
- Citizen Kane (1941) (introduced in Episode 2) dir. Orson Welles
- Nippon Sengoshi: "Madamu Onboro No Seikatsu (1970) dir. Shōhei Imamura
- Ajantrik (1958) dir. Ritwik Ghatak
- The Cloud-Capped Star (1960) dir. Ritwik Ghatak
- Jukti Takko Aar Gappo (1975) dir. Ritwik Ghatak
- Uski Roti (1970) dir. Mani Kaul
- Black God, White Devil (1964) dir. Glauber Rocha
- I Am Cuba (1964) dir. Mikhail Kalatozov
- The House Is Black (1963) (introduced in Episode 2) dir. Forugh Farrokhzad
- Black Girl (1966) dir. Ousmane Sembène
- Saturday Night and Sunday Morning (1960) dir. Karel Reisz
- Kes (1969) dir. Ken Loach
- A Hard Day's Night (1964) dir. Richard Lester
- Primary (1960) dir. Robert Drew
- Shadows (1959) dir. John Cassavetes
- Psycho (1960) dir. Alfred Hitchcock
- 66 Scenes from America (1982) dir. Jørgen Leth
- Blow Job (1963) dir. Andy Warhol
- Who's Afraid of Virginia Woolf? (1966) dir. Mike Nichols
- Medium Cool (1969) dir. Haskell Wexler
- Easy Rider (1969) dir. Dennis Hopper
- Making "The Shining" (1980) dir. Vivian Kubrick
- 2001: A Space Odyssey (1968) (introduced in Episode 1) dir. Stanley Kubrick
- Der Sieger (1921) dir. Walter Ruttmann

=== Episode 9: "American Cinema of the 70s" ===
1967–1979: New American Cinema.

- Duck Soup (1933) dir. Leo McCarey
- Artists and Models (1955) dir. Frank Tashlin
- Catch-22 (1970) dir. Mike Nichols
- Mash (1970) dir. Robert Altman
- The Graduate (1967) dir. Mike Nichols
- The Fireman's Ball (1967) (introduced in Episode 8) dir. Miloš Forman
- One Flew over the Cuckoo's Nest (1975) dir. Miloš Forman
- The Last Movie (1971) dir. Dennis Hopper
- McCabe & Mrs. Miller (1971) dir. Robert Altman
- The Conversation (1974) dir. Francis Ford Coppola
- Mean Streets (1973) dir. Martin Scorsese
- Taxi Driver (1976) (introduced in Episode 1) dir. Martin Scorsese
- Chikamatsu Monogatari (1954) (introduced in Episode 3) dir. Kenji Mizoguchi
- Raging Bull (1980) (introduced in Episode 5) dir. Martin Scorsese
- Italianamerican (1974) dir. Martin Scorsese
- American Gigolo (1980) (introduced in Episode 7) dir. Paul Schrader
- Light Sleeper (1992) dir. Paul Schrader
- Pickpocket (1959) (introduced in Episode 7) dir. Robert Bresson
- The Walker (2007) dir. Paul Schrader
- The Birth of a Nation (1915) (introduced in Episode 1) dir. D. W. Griffith
- Killer of Sheep (1978) dir. Charles Burnett
- The Shop Around the Corner (1940) dir. Ernst Lubitsch
- Annie Hall (1977) dir. Woody Allen
- City Lights (1931) (introduced in Episode 2) dir. Charlie Chaplin
- Manhattan (1979) dir. Woody Allen
- The Last Picture Show (1971) dir. Peter Bogdanovich
- The Wild Bunch (1969) dir. Sam Peckinpah
- Pat Garrett and Billy the Kid (1973) dir. Sam Peckinpah
- Badlands (1973) dir. Terrence Malick
- Days of Heaven (1978) dir. Terrence Malick
- Mirror (1975) (introduced in Episode 8) dir. Andrei Tarkovsky
- Cabaret (1972) dir. Bob Fosse
- The Godfather (1972) (introduced in Episode 6) dir. Francis Ford Coppola
- Chinatown (1974) dir. Roman Polanski
- The Maltese Falcon (1941) (introduced in Episode 2) dir. John Huston
- Jules et Jim (1962) dir. François Truffaut

=== Episode 10: "Movies to Change the World" ===
1969–1979: Radical Directors in the 70s: Make State of the Nation Movies.

- Fox and His Friends (1975) (a.k.a. Faustrecht der Freiheit) dir. Rainer Werner Fassbinder
- All That Heaven Allows (1955) (introduced in Episode 6) dir. Douglas Sirk
- Ali: Fear Eats the Soul (1974) (a.k.a. Angst essen Seele auf) dir. Rainer Werner Fassbinder
- The Bitter Tears of Petra von Kant (1972) (a.k.a. Die Bitteren Tränen der Petra von Kant) dir. Rainer Werner Fassbinder
- All About Eve (1950) dir. Joseph L. Mankiewicz
- Alice in the Cities (1974) (a.k.a. Alice in den Städten) dir. Wim Wenders
- An Affair to Remember (1957) dir. Leo McCarey
- Gods of the Plague (1970) (a.k.a. Götter der Pest) dir. Rainer Werner Fassbinder
- The Second Awakening of Christa Klages(1978) (a.k.a. Das zweite Erwachen der Christa Klages) dir. Margarethe von Trotta
- Burden of Dreams (1982) dir. Les Blank
- Arabian Nights (1974) (a.k.a. Il fiore delle mille e una notte) dir. Pier Paolo Pasolini
- The Spider's Stratagem (1970) (a.k.a. Strategia del ragno) dir. Bernardo Bertolucci
- The Conformist (1970) (a.k.a. Il conformista) dir. Bernardo Bertolucci
- Taxi Driver (1976) (introduced in Episode 1) dir. Martin Scorsese
- Women in Love (1969) dir. Ken Russell
- Performance (1970) dir. Donald Cammell & Nicolas Roeg
- Mean Streets (1973) (introduced in Episode 9) dir. Martin Scorsese
- Persona (1966) (introduced in Episode 7) dir. Ingmar Bergman
- Walkabout (1971) dir. Nicolas Roeg
- Picnic at Hanging Rock (1975) dir. Peter Weir
- My Brilliant Career (1979) dir. Gillian Armstrong
- Minamata: The Victims and Their World (1971) dir. Noriaki Tsuchimoto
- The Emperor's Naked Army Marches On (1987) dir. Kazuo Hara
- Black Girl (1966) (a.k.a. La noire de...) (introduced in Episode 8) dir. Ousmane Sembène
- Tarzan's Secret Treasure (1941) dir. Richard Thorpe
- La nouba des femmes du Mont Chenoua (1971) dir. Assia Djebar
- Xala (1975) dir. Ousmane Sembène
- Sinemaabi: A Dialogue with Djibril Diop Mambéty (1997) dir. Beti Ellerson Poulenc
- Badou Boy (1970) dir. Djibril Diop Mambéty
- Hyènes (1992) (a.k.a. Hyenas/Ramatou) dir. Djibril Diop Mambéty
- Kaddu Beykat (1975) (a.k.a. Lettre paysanne) dir. Safi Faye
- Harvest: 3,000 Years (1976) (a.k.a. Mirt sost shi amit) dir. Haile Gerima
- Umut (1970) (a.k.a. Hope) dir. Yilmaz Güney & Serif Gören
- Yol (1982) dir. Yilmaz Güney & Serif Gören
- The Battle of Chile (1975/1977/1979) (a.k.a. La batalla de Chile) dir. Patricio Guzmán
- The Holy Mountain (1973) (a.k.a. La montaña sagrada) dir. Alejandro Jodorowsky

=== Episode 11: "The Arrival of Multiplexes and Asian Mainstream" ===
1970s and Onwards: Innovation in Popular Culture: Around the World.

- The Kingdom and the Beauty (1959) dir. Li Han-hsiang
- A Touch of Zen (1971) dir. King Hu
- Enter the Dragon (1973) dir. Robert Clouse
- A Better Tomorrow (1986) dir. John Woo
- Iron Monkey (1993) dir. Yuen Woo-ping
- The Matrix (1999) dir. Lilly Wachowski & Lana Wachowski
- Once Upon a Time in China (1991) dir. Tsui Hark
- New Dragon Gate Inn (1992) dir. Raymond Lee
- Mughal-e-Azam (1960) dir. K. Asif
- Devi (1960) (introduced in Episode 6) dir. Satyajit Ray
- Mausam (1975) dir. Gulzar
- Zanjeer (1973) dir. Prakash Mehra
- Sholay (1975) dir. Ramesh Sippy
- The Message: The Story of Islam (1976) (a.k.a. Mohammad, Messenger of God) dir. Moustapha Akkad
- The Making of an Epic: Mohammad, Messenger of God (1976) dir. Geoffrey Helman & Christopher Penfold
- The Sparrow (1972) dir. Youssef Chahine
- The Exorcist (1973) dir. William Friedkin
- A Guy Named Joe (1943) dir. Victor Fleming
- Jaws (1975) dir. Steven Spielberg
- The Making of Steven Spielberg's Jaws (1995) dir. Laurent Bouzereau
- Vertigo (1958) (introduced in Episode 4) dir. Alfred Hitchcock
- Close Encounters of the Third Kind (1977) dir.Steven Spielberg
- Jurassic Park (1993) dir. Steven Spielberg
- Star Wars (1977) (introduced in Episode 1) dir. George Lucas
- The Hidden Fortress (1958) dir. Akira Kurosawa
- Triumph of the Will (1935) (a.k.a. Triumph des Willens) (introduced in Episode 4) dir. Leni Riefenstahl

=== Episode 12: "Fight the Power: Protest in Film" ===
The 1980s: Moviemaking and Protest: Around the World.

- The Horse Thief (1988) dir. Tian Zhuangzhuang
- Yellow Earth (1985) dir. Chen Kaige
- Raise the Red Lantern (1991) dir. Zhang Yimou
- House of Flying Daggers (2004) dir. Zhang Yimou
- Repentance (1984) dir. Tengiz Abuladze
- Arsenal (1929) (introduced in Episode 3) dir. Alexander Dovzhenko
- Come and See (1985) dir. Elem Klimov
- The Long Farewell (1971) dir. Kira Muratova
- A Short Film About Killing (1988) dir. Krzysztof Kieślowski
- Psycho (1960) (introduced in Episode 8) dir. Alfred Hitchcock
- Wend Kuuni (1983) dir. Gaston Kaboré
- Yeelen (1987) dir. Souleymane Cissé
- Video Killed the Radio Star (1979) (music video) dir. Russell Mulcahy
- Flashdance (1983) dir. Adrian Lyne
- Top Gun (1986) dir. Tony Scott
- Blue Velvet (1986) (introduced in Episode 3) dir. David Lynch
- The Elephant Man (1980) dir. David Lynch
- Do the Right Thing (1989) dir. Spike Lee
- The Third Man (1949) dir. Carol Reed(introduced in Episode 5)
- Return of the Secaucus 7 (1980) dir. John Sayles
- Subway (1985) dir. Luc Besson
- Les Amants du Pont-Neuf (1991) dir. Leos Carax
- An American in Paris (1951) dir. Vincente Minnelli (introduced in Episode 5)
- Labyrinth of Passion (1982) dir. Pedro Almodóvar
- A Hard Day's Night (1964) (introduced in Episode 8) dir. Richard Lester
- The Quince Tree Sun (1992) dir. Víctor Erice
- My Beautiful Laundrette (1985) dir. Stephen Frears
- My Childhood (1972) dir. Bill Douglas
- Gregory's Girl (1981) dir. Bill Forsyth
- Distant Voices, Still Lives (1988) dir. Terence Davies
- Intolerance (1916) dir. D. W. Griffith (introduced in Episode 1)
- Young at Heart (1954) dir. Gordon Douglas
- A Zed & Two Noughts (1986) dir. Peter Greenaway
- The Last of England (1988) dir. Derek Jarman
- Videodrome (1983) dir. David Cronenberg
- Crash (1996) dir. David Cronenberg
- Neighbours (1952) dir. Norman McLaren
- Jesus of Montreal (1989) dir. Denys Arcand

=== Episode 13: "New Boundaries: World Cinema in Africa, Asia & Latin America" ===
1990–1998: The Last Days of Celluloid: Before the Coming of Digital.

- The Apple (1998) dir. Samira Makhmalbaf
- A Moment of Innocence (1996) dir. Mohsen Makhmalbaf
- Where Is the Friend's Home? (1987) dir. Abbas Kiarostami
- And Life Goes On (1991) dir. Abbas Kiarostami
- Through the Olive Trees (1994) dir. Abbas Kiarostami
- Days of Being Wild (1990) dir. Wong Kar-wai
- In the Mood for Love (2000) dir. Wong Kar-wai
- Irma Vep (1996) dir. Olivier Assayas
- A City of Sadness (1989) dir. Hou Hsiao-hsien
- Tokyo Story (1953) (introduced in Episode 3) dir. Yasujirō Ozu
- Vive L'Amour (1994) dir. Tsai Ming-liang
- Tetsuo: The Iron Man (1989) dir. Shinya Tsukamoto
- Videodrome (1983) (introduced in Episode 12) dir. David Cronenberg
- Tetsuo II: Body Hammer (1992) dir. Shinya Tsukamoto
- La Roue (1923) (introduced in Episode 3) dir. Abel Gance
- Ringu (1998) dir. Hideo Nakata
- The Exorcist (1973) (introduced in Episode 11) dir. William Friedkin
- Ugetsu Monogatari (1953) dir. Kenji Mizoguchi
- Audition (1999) (introduced in Episode 4) dir. Takashi Miike
- Breaking the Waves (1996) dir. Lars von Trier
- Homicide: Life on the Street (1993-1999) dir. Tom Fontana
- Dogville (2003) dir. Lars von Trier (introduced in Episode 2)
- La Haine (1995) dir. Mathieu Kassovitz
- Do the Right Thing (1989) (introduced in Episode 12) dir. Spike Lee
- Humanité (1999) dir. Bruno Dumont
- Rosetta (1999) dir. Jean-Pierre Dardenne and Luc Dardenne
- Touki Bouki (1973) dir. Djibril Diop Mambéty
- Beau travail (1999) dir. Claire Denis
- Late Spring (1949) dir. Yasujirō Ozu
- Crows (1994) dir. Dorota Kędzierzawska
- Wednesday (1997) dir. Viktor Kossakovsky
- 24 Realities a Second (2004) dir. Nina Kusturica and Eva Testor
- Code Unknown (2000) (a.k.a. Code inconnu) (introduced in Episode 5) dir. Michael Haneke
- Funny Games (1997) dir. Michael Haneke
- Persona (1966) (introduced in Episode 7) dir. Ingmar Bergman

=== Episode 14: "New American Independents & The Digital Revolution" ===
The 1990s: The First Days of Digital: Reality Losing Its Realness in America and Australia.

- Gladiator (2000) dir. Ridley Scott
- Intolerance (1916) (introduced in Episode 1) dir. D. W. Griffith
- Terminator 2: Judgment Day (1991) dir. James Cameron
- Anchors Aweigh (1945) dir. George Sidney
- Gertie the Dinosaur (1914) (introduced in Episode 4) dir. Winsor McCay
- Jurassic Park (1993) (introduced in Episode 11) dir. Steven Spielberg
- Titanic (1997) (introduced in Episode 5) dir. James Cameron
- Toy Story (1995) dir. John Lasseter
- The Blair Witch Project (1999) dir. Daniel Myrick and Eduardo Sánchez
- House of Flying Daggers (2004) (introduced in Episode 12) dir. Zhang Yimou
- Goodfellas (1990) dir. Martin Scorsese
- The Great Train Robbery (1903) dir. Edwin S. Porter
- The Killers (1946) dir. Robert Siodmak
- Pulp Fiction (1994) dir. Quentin Tarantino
- Reservoir Dogs (1992) dir. Quentin Tarantino
- City on Fire (1987) dir. Ringo Lam
- Bande à Part (1964) dir. Jean-Luc Godard
- Natural Born Killers (1994) dir. Oliver Stone
- Miller's Crossing (1990) dir. Joel Coen and Ethan Coen
- The Hudsucker Proxy (1994) dir. Joel Coen and Ethan Coen
- O Brother, Where Art Thou? (2000) dir. Joel Coen and Ethan Coen
- The Big Lebowski (1998) dir. Joel Coen and Ethan Coen
- My Own Private Idaho (1991) dir. Gus Van Sant
- The Shining (1980) dir. Stanley Kubrick
- Elephant (2003) dir. Gus Van Sant
- Elephant (1989) dir. Alan Clarke
- Gerry (2002) dir. Gus Van Sant
- Sátántangó (1994) (introduced in Episode 5) dir. Béla Tarr
- Jeanne Dielman, 23 quai du Commerce, 1080 Bruxelles (1975) dir. Chantal Akerman
- Last Days (2005) dir. Gus Van Sant
- Psycho (1960) (introduced in Episode 8) dir. Alfred Hitchcock
- Psycho (1998) dir. Gus Van Sant
- Cremaster 3 (2002) dir. Matthew Barney
- Safety Last! (1923) (introduced in Episode 2) dir. Fred C. Newmeyer and Sam Taylor
- RoboCop (1987) dir. Paul Verhoeven
- Starship Troopers (1997) dir. Paul Verhoeven
- An Angel at My Table (1990) dir. Jane Campion
- The Piano (1993) dir. Jane Campion
- Romeo + Juliet (1996) dir. Baz Luhrmann
- Moulin Rouge! (2001) dir. Baz Luhrmann

=== Episode 15: "Cinema Today and the Future" ===
2000 Onwards: Film Moves Full Circle—and the Future of Movies.

- Swiss Miss (1938) dir. John G. Blystone and Hal Roach
- Blonde Venus (1932) dir. Josef von Sternberg
- Employees Leaving the Lumiere Factory (1895) (introduced in Episode 1) dir. Louis Lumière
- Fahrenheit 9/11 (2004) dir. Michael Moore
- The Bourne Supremacy (2004) dir. Paul Greengrass
- Être et avoir (2002) dir. Nicolas Philibert
- Zidane: "A Portrait in the 21st Century (2006) dir. Douglas Gordon and Philippe Parreno
- The Assassination of Jesse James by the Coward Robert Ford (2007) dir. Andrew Dominik
- Way Down East (1920) (introduced in Episode 1) dir. D. W. Griffith
- Climates (2006) dir. Nuri Bilge Ceylan
- The Death of Mr. Lazarescu (2005) dir. Cristi Puiu
- The Headless Woman (2008) dir. Lucrecia Martel
- Battle in Heaven (2005) dir. Carlos Reygadas
- Oasis (2002) dir. Lee Chang-Dong
- Memories of Murder (2003) dir. Bong Joon-ho
- Oldboy (2003) dir. Park Chan-wook
- Le Voyage dans la lune (1902) (introduced in Episode 1) dir. Georges Méliès (Although Mark Cousins and the title on the screen indicate that the scene being shown is from La lune à un mètre, the scene is actually from Le Voyage dans la lune.
- The Hour of the Furnaces (1968) dir. Octavio Getino and Fernando Solanas
- Mulholland Dr. (2001) dir. David Lynch
- Requiem for a Dream (2000) dir. Darren Aronofsky
- Songs from the Second Floor (2000) dir. Roy Andersson
- Way Out West (1937) dir. James W. Horne
- Indiscreet (1958) (introduced in Episode 5) dir. Stanley Donen
- Rules of Attraction (2002) dir. Roger Avary
- Avatar (2009) dir. James Cameron
- Motion Capture Mirrors Emotion (2009) dir. Jorge Ribas
- Tropical Malady (2004) dir. Apichatpong Weerasethakul
- Mother and Son (1997) dir. Alexander Sokurov
- Russian Ark (2002) dir. Alexander Sokurov
- In One Breath: Alexander Sokurov's Russian Ark(2003) dir. Knut Elstermann

Epilogue the Year 2046

- Inception (2010) (introduced in Episode 4) dir. Christopher Nolan
- Eternal Sunshine of the Spotless Mind (2004) dir. Michel Gondry

== Critical reception ==
The film earned critical praise. On the review aggregator website Rotten Tomatoes, 86% of 7 critics' reviews are positive, with an average rating of 6.1/10. Shawn Levy, writing for The Oregonian, compared it to "a tour through a museum with a deeply passionate and engaging guide." Mark Feeny, in The Boston Globe, described it as "wildly ambitious, often extremely good, occasionally maddening, and always stimulating."

=== Criticism ===
Some critics took issue with Cousins' speaking style, and with portions of his analysis. Village Voice critic Nick Pinkerton argued Cousins took an inconsistent and iconoclastic stance against Hollywood in favour of realist or innovative cinema, stating "for all its claims of rewriting, [The Story of Film] is too reliant on received film buff wisdom". Writing for Film Comment, Jonathan Rosenbaum was specifically critical of Cousins' view of experimental film, stating "Cousins has a weakness for overwrought yard sales, as his unswerving devotion to Baz Luhrmann, Christopher Nolan, and Lars von Trier repeatedly demonstrates — as well as an obvious lack of ease and fluency when it comes to experimental filmmaking in general, a discomfort that someone like (Matthew) Barney banks on by providing a “digestible” mainstream alternative, rather as Nolan’s Memento provides an unthreatening crossword-puzzle version of the early features of Alain Resnais."

== Accolades ==
- 2013 Peabody Award
- Runner-up for Best Documentary Feature—2012 Palm Springs International Film Festival
- Stanley Kubrick Award—2012 Traverse City Film Festival

== 2021 follow-up ==
A 2-hour-and-20-minute follow-up covering films from 2010 to 2021, titled The Story of Film: A New Generation, premiered at the Cannes Film Festival in July 2021. It was released in UK cinemas and on streaming platforms in December 2021.
