= Moustapha Ndoye =

Senegalese film director and photographer

- Born: 1968; Dakar, Senegal
- Died: 11 December 2009 (age 41); Dakar, Senegal
- Occupations: photographer, film director, screenwriter
- Known for: Sénégal, Salsa (2000); Combat pour la mer (2003)

Moustapha Ndoye (1968, Dakar – 11 December 2009, Dakar) was a Senegalese photographer, film director and screenwriter.

== Biography ==
Moustapha Ndoye was born in Dakar, Senegal, in 1968. Ndoye was of Lebu extraction. He was introduced to artistic circles by the Senegalese drummer Abdoulaye Prosper Niang, leader and cofounder of the Xalam band and supported musicians at concerts. Ndoye became involved in Senegalese cinema as a production and direction assistant for the movies Le Franc (1994) and La Petite Vendeuse de Soleil (1999) by director Djibril Diop Mambéty. In Paris Ndoye worked as a photographer and had an exhibition Cherche Billets in 1999 at the inauguration of the Alliance française at Ziguinchor, Senegal, and at the Mois de la photo(graphie) à Dakar.

In 2000, he created the TV music documentary Sénégal Salsa with support of the Senegal Ministries of Foreign Affairs and Culture and Communication. In 2003, he directed a documentary for France 5, Combat pour la mer, on the struggle of fishing communities in Bretagne and Senegal. Both movies were with Neri Productions in Paris, founded by filmmaker and actress Florence Arrigoni Neri.

After shooting his documentary on illegal immigration Wax pour wax rek, les mots pour le dire, Ndoye died at the hospital of Dakar of a stroke on 11 December 2009.

Wax pour wax rek was published posthumously.

== Filmography ==
Ndoye's films include:

Year	Film	Genre	Role	Duration
1994	Le Franc	Comedy	Production and direction assistant	45 minutes
1999	La Petite Vendeuse de Soleil	Drama	Production and direction assistant	45 m
2000	Sénégal Salsa	TV Music documentary	Director and screenwriter	52 or 55 m
2002	Combat pour la mer	TV Documentary on the struggle of fishing communities in Bretagne and Senegal	Director and screenwriter	49 or 52 m
2009	Wax pour wax rek, les mots pour le dire	Documentary on clandestine emigration	Director	

== Awards ==
Sénégal Salsa won two prizes at the 2001 Festival International de Programmes Audiovisuels (FIPA) at Biarritz: the Music and Live Events Silver FIPA and Michel Mitrani Awards. At the Panafrican Film and Television Festival of Ouagadougou (FESPACO) 2001 it won the Prix de la Guilde des cinéastes et producteurs africains and the Prix technique du meilleur son FESTEL at the Festival de Films du Cameroun 2001.

== See also ==
- Cinema of Senegal
- List of Senegalese films
