= La Petite Vendeuse de Soleil =

- Directed by: Djibril Diop Mambéty
- Written by: Djibril Diop Mambéty
- Screenplay by: Djibril Diop Mambéty
- Produced by: Waka Films, Maag Daan, Renardes Productions
- Starring: Lissa Baléra, Tayerou M’Baye, Oumou Samb, Moussa Baldé, Dieynaba Laam, Martin N’Gom
- Cinematography: Jacques Besse
- Edited by: Sarah Taouss-Matton
- Music by: Wasis Diop
- Distributed by: California Newsreel Productions
- Release date: February 1, 1999 (International Film Festival Rotterdam)
- Running time: 45 minutes
- Country: Senegal
- Language: Wolof

La Petite Vendeuse de Soleil (or The Little Girl Who Sold the Sun) is a 1999 Senegalese drama film, directed by Djibril Diop Mambéty which premiered after his death in 1998.

La Petite Vendeuse de Soleil is a film exalting the lives and promise found among ordinary Senegalese. It depicts a young beggar girl, Sili, who is also a paraplegic, who on crutches, confidently makes her way through a city of obstacles, becoming the first girl to sell the "Le Soleil" national daily newspaper in the competitive world of young male newspaper vendors. Mambéty dedicated this last film to "the courage of street children". The scenes are expertly played by non-professional actors and with the participation of the street children.

The film is part of a series entitled "Tales of Ordinary People".

It was screened as part of the International Forum of New Cinema section at the 49th Berlin International Film Festival in 1999 and as part of the New York Film Festival in 2019.

La Petite Vendeuse de Soleil was originally intended as the second film of a trilogy under the title, Tales of Ordinary People. However, Mambety's untimely death in 1998 prevented the completion of the third film.

== Synopsis ==
In Dakar, selling newspapers on the street is an occupation always occupied by boys. But one morning, Sili, a young beggar, challenges that exclusive rule. Her age is uncertain, between 10 and 13, and she walks the streets with the help of her crutches. She begs for help in the same spot the boys sell their papers, but today they attack her and she falls, rolling over and over. That's it; she too will sell newspapers starting tomorrow.

== Cast ==
- Lissa Balera as "Sili"
- Dieynaba Laam as "Grandmother"
- Tayerou M'Baye as "Babou Seck"
- Martin N'Gom as "Gang Leader"
- Oumou Samb as "Crazy Woman"

== Release ==
La Petite Vendeuse de Soleil debuted on 1 February 1999 at the International Film Festival Rotterdam and opened in other film festivals on the dates given below.

Region	Release date	Festival
Netherlands	1 February 1999	International Film Festival Rotterdam
Germany	20 February 1999	Berlin International Film Festival
New Zealand	27 July 1999	Wellington Film Festival
Canada	12 September 1999	Toronto International Film Festival
U.S.A	October 1999	Chicago International Film Festival
Hong Kong	21 April 2000	Hong Kong International Film Festival
Norway	1 May 2002	Kristiansand International Children's Film Festival

=== Home Release ===
La Petite Vendeuse de Soleil (The Little Girl who Sold the Sun) was released on DVD coupled with Le Franc and is distributed by California Newsreel Productions.

== Critical response ==
Critical response to the film was mostly positive. Reviewer for The New York Times, A.O. Scott described the film as a "masterpiece of understated humanity".

- "The last film by Senegalese filmmaker Djibril Diop Mambéty (1945–98) is a wondrously affirmative marketplace legend-cum-political allegory about an indomitable crippled girl, granddaughter of a blind street singer, who reinvents herself as a newspaper vendor. The score is infectious, and the metaphor overwhelming." – The Village Voice
- "The dreams of Djibril Diop Mambety have flown beyond the screens, to glide like whimsical and devouring suns." – Ecrans d'Afrique

== Accolades ==
La Petite Vendeuse de Soleil earned various awards and nominations, with the nominations in categories ranging from recognition of the film itself to its screenplay, direction and editing, to the performance of the lead actor, Lissa Balera. It was selected as one of the ten best films of 2000 by the Village Voice.

Year	Film Festival	Award	Category	Recipients	Result
1999	Castellinaria International Festival of Young Cinema	Special Mention	Acting	Lissa Balera	Won
1999	International Biennal for Film Music	International Prize for Film and Media Music	Special Mention	Wasis Diop	Won
1999	Namur International Festival of French-Speaking Film	ACCT Promotional Award	Best Actor/Actress of the South	Lissa Balera	Won
1999	Namur International Festival of French-Speaking Film	Golden Bayard	Best Film (Meilleur Film Francophone)	Djibril Diop Mambéty	Nominated
1999	Namur International Festival of French-Speaking Film	Jury Special Prize		Djibril Diop Mambéty	Won
1999	Namur International Festival of French-Speaking Film	Procirep Award		Djibril Diop Mambéty	Won
2000	Aspen Shortsfest	The Ellen		Djibril Diop Mambéty	Won
2000	Chicago International Children's Film Festival	Adult's Jury Award	Short Film or Video – Live-Action	Djibril Diop Mambéty	Won
2000	Los Angeles Pan African Film Festival	Best Short		Djibril Diop Mambéty	Won
