= Mambéty for Ever =

Mambéty For Ever
- Directed by: Aïssatou Bah, Guy Padja
- Screenplay by: Aïssatou Bah, Guy Padja
- Produced by: Sud Plateau TV
- Starring: Wasis Diop, Teemour Diop Mambéty, Brice Ahounou, Catherine Ruelle, Cheick Fantamady Camara, Mahamt Saleh Haroun, Abderrahmane Sissako, Mahama Johnson Traoré, Newton Aduaka, Gérard Essomba, Osange Silou, Thierno Ibrahima Dia
- Cinematography: Mathias Kalin
- Edited by: Nathalie Bertaux
- Music by: Wasis Diop, Teemour Diop Mambéty
- Release date: 2008
- Running time: 80 minutes
- Countries: Cameroon; France

Mambéty For Ever is a 2008 documentary film.

== Synopsis ==
A film made in Cameroon and France about the life and work of filmmaker Djibril Diop Mambéty, with testimonials from filmmakers Abderrahmane Sissako, Newton Aduaka and Mahamat-Saleh Haroun, Cheick Fantamady Camara, Mahama Johnson Traoré; critics Catherine Ruelle, Thierno I. Dia and Brice Ahounou; Cameroonian actor Gérard Essomba; Mambéty's brother, Wasis Diop; and his son, Teemour Diop.
