= Kakashi =

Kakashi may refer to:

- Kakashi Hatake, fictional character from the Naruto series
- Kakashi (album), 1982 album by Yasuaki Shimizu
- Kakashi (film), 2001 film by Tsuruta Norio
