= No Sant =

Studio album by Wasis Diop
- Released: 1996
- Label: Triloka
- Producer: Yasuaki Shimizu, Wasis Diop

Wasis Diop chronology
Hyènes (1993)	No Sant (1996)	Toxu (1998)

No Sant is an album by the Senegalese musician Wasis Diop. It was released internationally in 1996.

"African Dream" peaked at No. 44 on the UK Singles Chart.

== Production ==
The album was produced by Yasuaki Shimizu and Diop. Diop sang in Wolof, English, and French. The album employed choirs, talking drums, saxophone, and bagpipes among its instrumentation.

"Dem Ba Ma (Le Dernier Qui a Parlé)" was written by Amina Annabi. Lena Fiagbe sang on the album. "T.G.V." is about French oppression in Africa.

== Critical reception ==
Professional ratings
Review scores
Source	Rating
AllMusic	4.5/5 stars
Robert Christgau	(dud)
The Encyclopedia of Popular Music	4/5 stars
MusicHound World: The Essential Album Guide	4/5 stars
The Sydney Morning Herald	4/5 stars
Vancouver Sun	4/4 stars

The Orange County Register called the music "sometimes ambient and introspective... It's often as solemnly beautiful as morning prayer." The Vancouver Sun wrote that Diop's "voice is a comforting instrument that moves softly and gently through this free-form pop release, making it familiar on first listen." The Miami New Times labeled the album "a brilliant musical tapestry that deftly weaves instrumentation from Africa, Asia, Europe, and the Americas."

The Gazette stated that Diop "spins his moody tales with pristine clarity and grace... The production values are extremely high while arrangements are inventive and often surprising." The Sydney Morning Herald determined that No Sant, "like so many great contemporary world music recordings, is a demonstration of the seemingly endless possibilities available when traditional African music collides with Western pop." The Santa Fe New Mexican deemed it perhaps "the best Afropop album of the year," writing that "the emphasis here is on the overall sound, which is resonant and sweet, driven by sparse but well-placed percussion, and colored with airy sax and keyboard flavorings."

== Track listing ==
No.	Title	Length
1.	"African Dream"
2.	"Di Na Wo"
3.	"Holaal Bu Baah"
4.	"T.G.V."
5.	"Ma Na"
6.	"Dames Electriques"
7.	"N.O.P."
8.	"No Sant"
9.	"Issa Thiaw"
10.	"La Danse des Maures"
11.	"Dem Ba Ma (Le Dernier Qui a Parlé)"
12.	"Sb – Le Voyageur"
