= Mati Diop =

French film director and actress

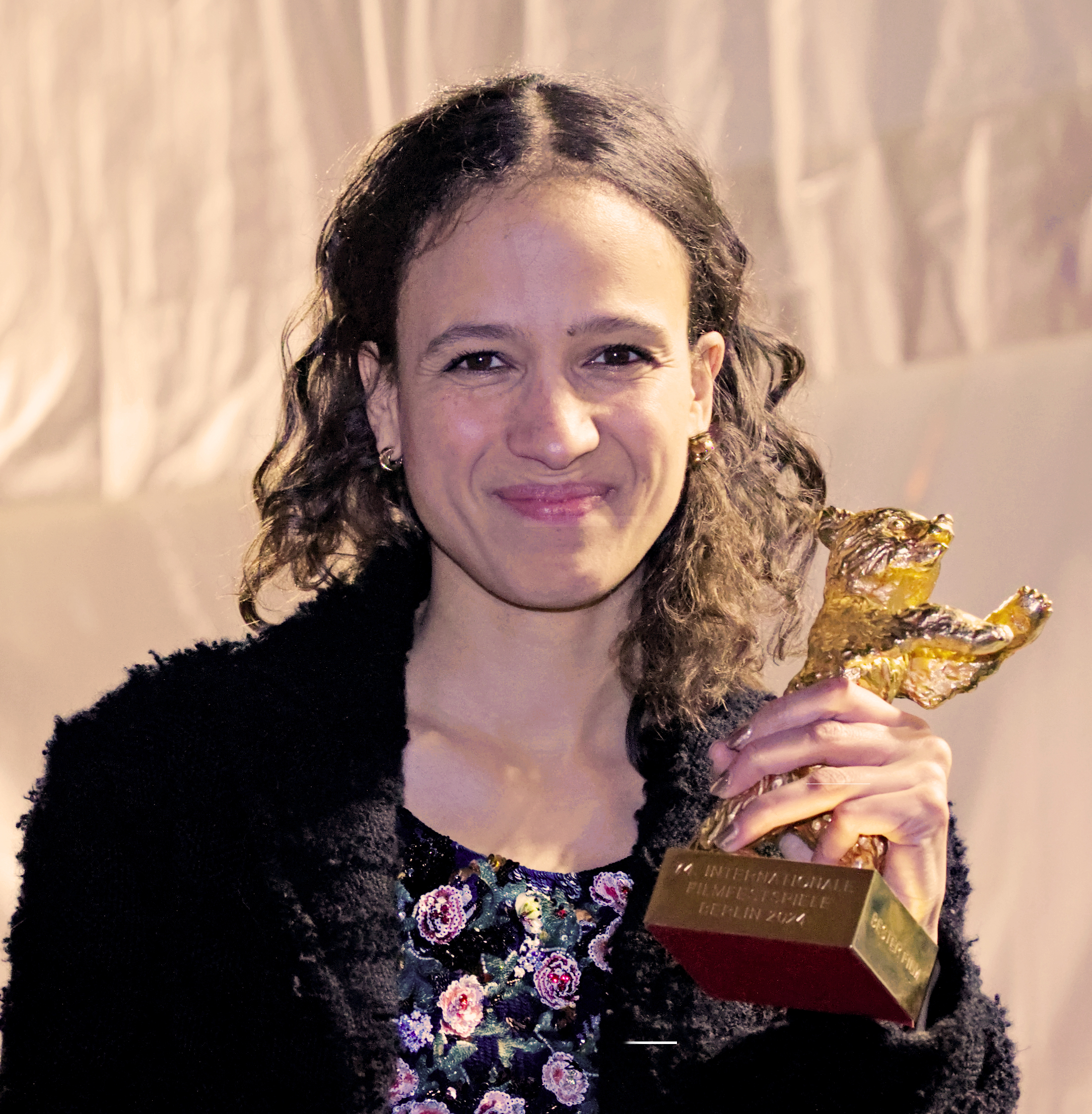
- Diop in 2024
- Born: 22 June 1982 (age 44); Paris, France
- Occupations: Film director; actress; screenwriter
- Years active: 2004–present
- Father: Wasis Diop
- Relatives: Djibril Diop Mambéty (uncle)

Mati Diop (born 22 June 1982) is a French film director and actress. She won the Grand Prix at the 2019 Cannes Film Festival for her feature film debut, the supernatural romantic drama Atlantics, and the Golden Bear at the 2024 Berlin International Film Festival for her second feature film, the documentary Dahomey. As an actress, she is known for the drama film 35 Shots of Rum (2008).

== Early life ==
Diop was born in Paris, France. Her father, Wasis Diop, is a black Senegalese musician, while her mother, Christine Brossard, is a white French art buyer and photographer. She is the niece of filmmaker Djibril Diop Mambéty. During her childhood, she often travelled back and forth between France and Senegal, developing a transnational identity.

== Education ==
Diop trained in the Advanced Degree Programme at Le Fresnoy National Studio of Contemporary Art in France, as well as at the Palais de Tokyo in their experimental artist studio space Le Pavillon.

== Career ==
Diop was a fellow at the Radcliffe Institute for Advanced Study from 2014 to 2015. Her work there focused on themes of exile, identity, memory, and loss, utilizing both fiction and documentary techniques. While a part of the institute's selective Film Study Center Fellowship Program, she wrote the script for her first feature film Fire, Next Time. She later changed the title of this film to what is now known as her directorial feature film debut, Atlantics (2019).

In 2025, Mati Diop launched a U.S. university tour to present her documentary Dahomey, engaging in discussions on cultural restitution and decolonization. The tour included screenings and conversations at institutions such as Harvard University, Duke University, Columbia University, Pratt Institute, and Emory University.

=== Directing ===
Diop made her directorial debut in 2004 with her short film Last Night (2004). Her short film Atlantiques (2009) won the Rotterdam International Film Festival's Tiger Award for Short Film, and a Top Prize at Media City Film Festival during her first North American appearance in 2009.

Her documentary short Mille Soleils was released in 2013. The film focused on actor Magaye Niang, who was the star of Diop's uncle's seminal feature Touki Bouki (1973) and explained how he had come to live as a farmer in the intervening years. The film played at the 2013 Toronto International Film Festival and was later also programmed at the Museum of Modern Art in 2014.

In 2019, she became the first black female director to have her film premiere in competition at the Cannes Film Festival when her feature debut Atlantics was selected to compete for the Palme d'Or. She was one of only four women accepted into the festival in the given year. The film was a fictional adaptation of her documentary short Atlantiques made in 2009 that followed two friends from Senegal as they made a life-threatening boat crossing to Europe. The film won the Grand Prix. It was picked up by Netflix shortly following Cannes' award announcements, however it is not a Netflix Original Film.

Diop directed a documentary, In My Room, as part of Miu Miu's Women's Tales series, which blended audio recordings of her maternal grandmother, Maji, with footage Diop shot of herself in her Parisian apartment during the time she was quarantined during the 2020 COVID-19 pandemic.

Diop's work has been featured at the Venice Film Festival, the New York Film Festival, the BFI London Film Festival in 2012, and the Valdivia International Film Festival, as well as the Museum of the Moving Image in 2013.

In 2024, she won the Golden Bear at the Berlinale with the documentary, Dahomey, devoted to the question of the restitution by France of works of art stolen from Dahomey, present-day Benin.

=== Acting ===
Diop made her acting debut in Claire Denis' film 35 Shots of Rum (2008), playing the lead role of a young woman in a close-knit relationship with her father, whom she has trouble leaving as she gets ready for marriage. She received a nomination for the Lumière Award for Most Promising Actress for her role in the film. In 2012, she appeared in the film Simon Killer and was also credited with the story behind the script. Diop continues to act sporadically in films and television.

=== Advertising ===
In 2026, Diop featured in an advertising campaign of Phoebe Philo's eponymous fashion brand.

== Artistry and themes ==
In a 2025 interview with the Financial Times, Diop discussed her cinematic approach, emphasizing the importance of centering African and diasporic narratives. She cited influences from American underground cinema, including filmmakers like Larry Clark and Harmony Korine, and highlighted her commitment to creating films that resonate deeply with African and Black audiences.

In their article on Diop's work up to Atlantics (2019), Lindsay Turner states that Diop's work is often concerned with trans-nationalism, immigration, the female experience, and post-colonialism in relation with North Africa and Europe. In order to start work on Atlantics, she began travelling to Senegal to reconnect with her African heritage. She says she found her voice in those journeys—and in her own French-Senegalese hyphenated identity. In an interview with Metal Magazine, Diop explains that she tackles cinematics and poetic aspects of her film with different perspectives due to the contrasting "sensibilities" of French and African cultures.

Diop uses aspects of magical realism in her films, examples including Atlantics (2019), Snow Cannon (2011), and Big in Vietnam (2012). Diop can also be quoted talking about her storytelling processes, notably on how she uses sets and props to convey her plots as opposed to just characters and dialogue. During additional interviews, Diop has mentioned that she has done a majority of her own cinematography and is deeply interested in multiculturalism and multilingualism in film, as her films are often in two to three different languages.

== Filmography ==
=== Acting ===
Year	Title	Role	Notes
2008	35 Shots of Rum	Joséphine	
2010	Yoshido (Les autres vies)	Amy	
2010	A History of Mutual Respect		Short film
2011	La collection	Jehanne	Episode: "Bye Bye"
2011	Sleepwalkers		
2011	Another World	Sita	Television film
2012	Simon Killer	Victoria / Noura	
2012	Fort Buchanan: Hiver		Short film
2014	Fort Buchanan	Justine	
2014	L for Leisure	Stacey	
2016	Hermia & Helena	Danièle	
2022	Both Sides of the Blade	Gabrielle	

=== Filmmaking ===
Year	Title	Director	Writer	Cinematographer	Notes
2004	Last Night	Yes			Short film
2006	Île artificielle – Expédition	Yes			Short film
2009	Atlantiques	Yes		Yes	Documentary short
2011	Sleepwalkers	No	No	Yes	
2011	Snow Canon	Yes	Yes	No	Short film
2012	Simon Killer	No	Yes	No	
2012	Big in Vietnam	Yes	Yes	Yes	Short film
2013	Les Apaches	No	No	No	Costume designer
2013	Mille Soleils	Yes		Yes	Documentary short
2014	Les 18 du 57, Boulevard de Strasbourg	Yes			Short film, co-director (Collectif des Cinéastes Pour les Sans-Papiers)
2015	Liberian Boy	Yes		Yes	Short film, co-directed with Manon Lutanie
2017	Olympus	Yes			Short film
2019	30 (+) films pour la 30ème (Segment: "Untitled")	Yes	Yes		Documentary, also editor and producer
2019	Atlantics	Yes	Yes	No	
2020	In My Room	Yes	Yes		Documentary short
2021	Wasis Diop – Voyage à Paris	Yes		Yes	Music video
2022	Naked Blue	Yes		Yes	Short film, co-directed with Manon Lutanie
2024	Dahomey	Yes	Yes		Documentary

== Accolades ==
Awards and nominations
Year	Festival	Awards	Film	Result
2010	Cinèma du Rèel	Louis Marcorelles Award – Mention	Atlantiques	Won
2011	Venice Film Festival	Queer Lion	Snow Cannon	Nominated
2010	Rotterdam International Film Festival	Tiger Award for Short Film	Big in Vietnam	Won
2012	Rotterdam International Film Festival	Tiger Award for Short Film	Atlantiques	Won
2013	Amiens International Film Festival	Prix du Moyen mètrage	Mille Solelies	Won
2013	CPH:DOX	New Vision Award	Mille Solelies	Nominated
2013	Montréal Festival of New Cinema	Loup Argenté	Mille Solelies	Won
2014	Black Movie Film Festival	Critics Prize	Mille Solelies	Won
2014	IndieLisboa International Independent Film Festival	Short Film Grand Prize	Mille Solelies	Won
2019	Boston Society of Film Critics Awards	BSFC Award: Best New Filmmaker	Atlantics	Nominated
2019	Camerimage	Best Directorial Debut	Atlantics	Nominated
2019	Cannes Film Festival	Grand Prize of the Jury	Atlantics	Won
2019	Cannes Film Festival	Palme d'Or	Atlantics	Nominated
2019	Cannes Film Festival	Caméra d'Or	Atlantics	Nominated
2019	Carthage Film Festival	Tanit d'Argent Tanit d'Or	Atlantics	Won
2019	Chicago Film Critics Association Awards	Milos Stehlik Award: Most Promising Filmmaker	Atlantics	Nominated
2019	Denver International Film Festival	Krzysztof Kieslowski Award: Best Feature Film	Atlantics	Nominated
2019	European Film Awards	European Film Award: European Discovery	Atlantics	Nominated
2019	Ghent International Film Festival	Grand Prix: Best Film	Atlantics	Nominated
2019	Greater Western New York Film Critics Association Awards	GWNYFCA Award: Breakthrough Director	Atlantics	Nominated
2019	Hamptons International Film Festival	Golden Starfish Award: Narrative Feature	Atlantics	Nominated
2019	Indiewire Critics' Poll	IPC Award: Best First Feature	Atlantics	Won
2019	Key West Film Festival	Critics' Choice Award	Atlantics	Won
2019	London Film Festival	Sutherland Award: First Feature Competition	Atlantics	Won
2019	Mumbai Film Festival	International Competition: Golden Gateway Award	Atlantics	Nominated
2019	Odyssey Awards	Odyssey Award: Breakthrough Director	Atlantics	Nominated
2019	Pingyao International Film Festival	People's Choice Award: Best of Fest – Best Film	Atlantics	Nominated
2019	Prix Louis Delluc	Prix Louis Delluc: Best First Film	Atlantics	Nominated
2019	San Sebastián International Film Festival	Zabaltegi-Tabakalera Prize	Atlantics	Nominated
2019	Stockholm Film Festival	Impact Award	Atlantics	Nominated
2019	Toronto Film Critics Association Awards	TFCA Award: Best First Feature	Atlantics	Nominated
2019	Women Film Critics Circle Awards	WFCC Award: Best Woman Storyteller	Atlantics	Nominated
2020	Austin Film Critics Association	AFCA Award: Best First Film	Atlantics	Nominated
2020	Black Reel Awards	Outstanding Director, Motion Picture. Outstanding Emerging Director. Outstanding First Screenplay.	Atlantics	Nominated
2020	Cinema Eye Honors Awards, US	Heterodox Award	Atlantics	Nominated
2020	Cèsar Awards, France	Cèsar: Best First Film	Atlantics	Nominated
2020	Directors Guild of America, USA	DGA Award: Outstanding Directorial Achievement in First-Time Feature Film	Atlantics	Nominated
2020	Gold Derby Awards	Gold Derby Award: Foreign Language Film	Atlantics	Nominated
2020	Image Awards (NAACP)	Image Award: Outstanding Directing in a Motion Picture (Film)	Atlantics	Nominated
2020	International Cinephile Society Awards	ICS Award: Best Debut Feature	Atlantics	Nominated
2020	Lumière Awards, France	Lumière Award: Best First Film	Atlantics	Nominated
2020	Online Film and Television Association	OFTA Film Award: Best Feature Debut	Atlantics	Nominated
2020	Online Film Critics Society Awards	OFCS Award: Best Debut		Nominated
2020	Palm Springs International Film Festival	Directors to Watch FIPRESCI Prize		Won
2024	Berlin International Film Festival	Golden Bear	Dahomey	Won
