= Aïcha Thiam =

Senegalese film director

- Born: 27 October 1979 (age 46); Antwerp, Belgium
- Education: Cheikh Anta Diop University; Senghor University; Grenoble Alpes University
- Occupation: Film director
- Years active: 2003-present
- Awards: Best Video Prize at the Montreal Francophone Video Festival

Aïcha Thiam (born 27 October 1979) is a Belgian-Senegalese film director.

== Biography ==
Thiam was born in 1979 in Antwerp, the daughter of a Senegalese father and Malian mother. She lived in Antwerp for her first three years before moving to Senegal. Her mother's stories of Antwerp inspired Thiam to return to the city. She grew up between Belgium, Democratic Republic of the Congo, Senegal and Mali. Thiam earned her baccalaureate in Dakar and enrolled at the Faculty of Legal Sciences at the Cheikh Anta Diop University in Dakar. She ended her legal studies to study audiovisual professions at the Media Center of Dakar.

In 2003, Thiam directed her first short film, Fisabillahi. The film tackled the subject of begging by talibe children in Dakar and won several awards, including Best Video Prize at the Montreal Francophone Video Festival. She continued her training on the film sets of the filmmaker Moussa Séne Absa. Thiam served as an assistant to Johnson Traoré on several documentary films and participated in the documentary screenwriting workshops of the Africadoc association. Since 2004, she has worked as a director at Senegalese National Television (RTS1) as well as freelancing on documentary and fiction film projects.

In 2006 she began her studies at Senghor University in audiovisual production management. During her time at the university, Thiam directed several short documentaries and institutional films. She directed Le Cri de la Mer in 2008. It focused on immigrant Yaye Bayam Diouf, and the loss of her son is central to the narrative. The film was produced as part of the Femmes Battantes series, and received funding from Senegal and Belgium. In 2011, she earned her master's degree in creative documentary direction at Grenoble Alpes University. The same year, Thiam directed Le Jeu du coq et de la camera, which questions the relationship between the filmmaker and the film subject.

In 2014, Thiam directed Camarade Etudiant on the topic of higher education in Senegal. She directed her first feature film, La Rue des Sœurs Noires, in 2014. Coproduced by Survivance and DS Productions, it examines the history of the diamond trade in Antwerp as well as African migration. In 2019, Thiam became a member of the official jury of the sixth Documentary Film Festival of Saint-Louis, Senegal.

She lives and works in Dakar.

== Filmography ==
- 2003 : Fisabillahi (short film)
- 2005 : Gabil le pagne magique (short film)
- 2006 : Yakaar (short film)
- 2006 : Juste un bout de papier (short film)
- 2006 : Papa (short film)
- 2008 : Le Cri de la Mer (short film)
- 2011 : Le Jeu du coq et de la camera (short film)
- 2012 : Fatou Fatou Mécaniciennes
- 2014 : Camarade Etudiant (short film)
- 2014 : La Rue des Sœurs Noires
