= Contras'city =

- Directed by: Djibril Diop Mambéty
- Screenplay by: Djibril Diop Mambéty
- Produced by: Kankourama
- Starring: Inge Hirschnitz, Djibril Diop Mambéty
- Cinematography: Georges Bracher
- Edited by: Jean-Bernard Bonis, Marino Rio
- Music by: Djimbo Kouyaté
- Release date: 1968
- Running time: 15 minutes
- Country: Senegal

Contras'city is a Senegalese 1968 short documentary film.

== Synopsis ==
A fictional documentary that portrays the city of Dakar, Senegal, as we hear the conversation between a Senegalese man (the director, Djibril Diop Mambéty) and a French woman, Inge Hirschnitz. As we travel through the city in a picturesque horse-drawn wagon, we chaotically rush into this and that popular neighborhood of the capital, discovering contrast after contrast: A small African community waiting at the Church's door, Muslims praying on the sidewalk, the Rococo architecture of the Government buildings, the modest stores of the craftsmen near the main market.

According to one scholar, the title and content of the film suggest "the socio-cultural dichotomies often present in African urban centers."

== See also ==
- Cinema of Senegal
