= Zac Stuart-Pontier =

American film editor

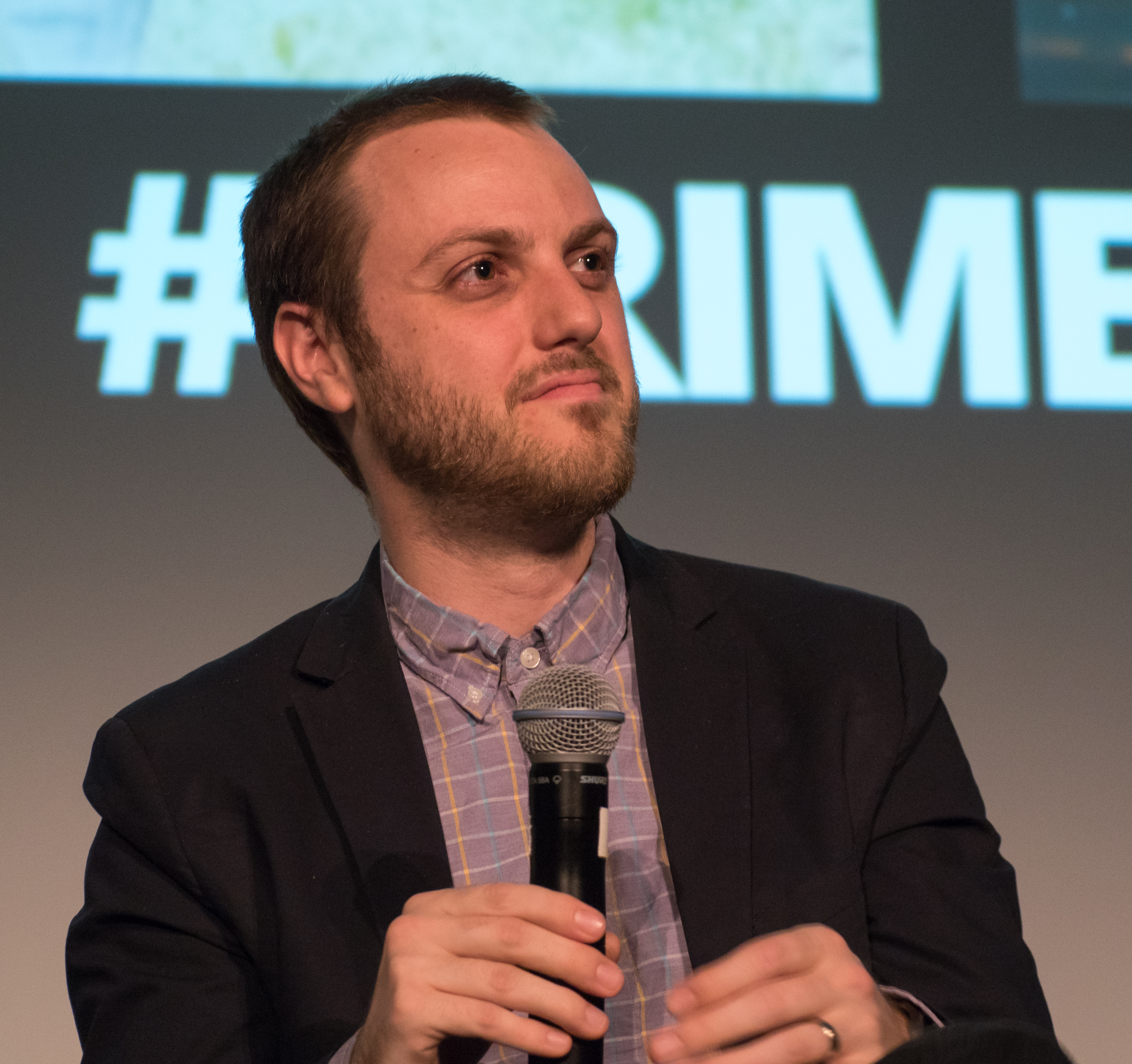
- Born: September 12, 1983 (age 42); Honesdale, Pennsylvania, US
- Occupations: Editor, host and Producer
- Years active: 2005–present

Zac Stuart-Pontier is an American film editor, host and producer. He is known for his work on the HBO documentary The Jinx, Catfish and Martha Marcy May Marlene.

== Life and career ==
Zac was born in Honesdale, Pennsylvania. He graduated from NYU's Tisch School of the Arts. In 2010, he edited and co-produced the film, Catfish, premiered at the 2010 Sundance Film Festival.

Zac is the co-host and co-creator of the true crime podcasts Crimetown with Marc Smerling, which debuted in 2016 and quickly became the most popular U.S. podcast on iTunes. They also co-created The RFK Tapes a Crimetown Presents podcast about the Assassination of Robert F. Kennedy.

== Filmography ==
Year	Title	Contribution	Note
2019	Markie in Milwaukee	Producer	Documentary film
2017	Give Me Future	Supervising editor	Documentary film
2016	Bleed for This	Editor	Feature film
2016	10 Crosby	Editor	Short film
2016	Durango	Executive producer	Documentary short
2015	The Jinx	Editor, writer and Co-Executive Producer	6 episodes
2014	The Hardest Word	Co-producer	Short film
2013	The Apocalypse	Editor	Short film
2012	Witness	Editor	6 episode
2012	Superfly	Editor and co-producer	Documentary short
2012	Simon Killer	Editor	Feature film
2011	The Light in the Night	Editor	Short film
2011	How It Ended	Editor	Short film
2011	Martha Marcy May Marlene	Editor	Feature film
2010	Kids in Love	Editor	Short film
2010	NY Export: Opus Jazz	Editor	Feature film
2010	Beautiful Darling	Editor and co-producer	Documentary film
2010	Catfish	Editor and co-producer	Documentary film
2009	I Will Protect You	Editor	Documentary film
2009	Science Fair	Editor	Short film
2008	The Hollow Tree	Editor	Short film
2007	Leaving Gussie	Editor	Short film
2007	Night Falls	Editor	Short film
2005	Flutter Kick	Editor	Short film

== Awards and nominations ==
Year	Result	Award	Category	Work	Ref.
2016	Won	American Cinema Editors	Best Edited Documentary - Television	The Jinx	
2015	Won	Primetime Emmy Award	Outstanding Documentary or Nonfiction Series	The Jinx	
2015	Won	Primetime Emmy Award	Outstanding Picture Editing for a Nonfiction Program	The Jinx	
2015	Won	International Documentary Association	Best Limited Series	The Jinx	
2012	Nominated	Online Film Critics Society	Best Editing	Martha Marcy May Marlene	
2012	Nominated	International Cinephile Society	Best Editing	Martha Marcy May Marlene	
2008	Won	First Run Film Festival	Best Editing	Science Fair	
2005	Won	First Run Film Festival	Best Editing	Flutter Kick	
