= Parlons Grand-mère =

- Directed by: Djibril Diop Mambéty
- Written by: Djibril Diop Mambéty
- Produced by: Djibril Diop Mambéty
- Edited by: Djibril Diop Mambéty
- Release date: 1989
- Running time: 34 minutes
- Country: Senegal

Parlons Grand-mère is a Senegalese 1989 short documentary film.

Djibril Diop Mambéty followed and filmed the shooting of Yaaba, Idrissa Ouédraogo's second feature film.

A documentary full of humorous anecdotes regarding the dangers of shooting films in Burkina Faso.

== See also ==
- Cinema of Senegal
