= Martha Marcy May Marlene =

2011 film

- Theatrical release poster
- Directed by: Sean Durkin
- Written by: Sean Durkin
- Produced by: Antonio Campos; Patrick S. Cunningham; Josh Mond
- Starring: Elizabeth Olsen; John Hawkes; Sarah Paulson; Hugh Dancy
- Cinematography: Jody Lee Lipes
- Edited by: Zac Stuart-Pontier
- Music by: Danny Bensi; Saunder Jurriaans
- Production companies: This is that Borderline Films
- Distributed by: Fox Searchlight Pictures
- Release dates: January 21, 2011 (Sundance); October 21, 2011 (United States)
- Running time: 102 minutes
- Country: United States
- Language: English
- Budget: $600,000
- Box office: $5.4 million

Martha Marcy May Marlene is a 2011 American psychological thriller drama film written and directed by Sean Durkin in his directorial feature film debut, and starring Elizabeth Olsen (in her film debut), John Hawkes, Sarah Paulson, and Hugh Dancy. The plot focuses on a young woman suffering from PTSD after fleeing a violent and sexually abusive cult commune in the Catskill Mountains.

Martha Marcy May Marlene premiered at the 2011 Sundance Film Festival on January 21, 2011, where Durkin won the Directing Award, before it received a limited release by Fox Searchlight Pictures in theatres starting October 21. The film received praise, particularly for the performances of Olsen and Hawkes; the former receiving nominations for Best Actress at the Critics' Choice, Independent Spirit and Satellite Awards.

== Plot ==
A 22-year-old woman named Martha has been abused by a cult in the Catskill Mountains for two years. The patriarch, Patrick, named her Marcy May. She escapes into the woods, arriving at a nearby town. In a diner, she is confronted by Watts, a cult member, who attempts to persuade her to return, but when she refuses, he lets her leave. Martha calls her sister, Lucy, who picks her up and takes her to the vacation lake house in Connecticut that she shares with her husband, a successful architect named Ted.

Martha exhibits strange behavior by skinny dipping in public, sleeping all the time, not eating, and arguing with Lucy and Ted about how to live, specifically arguing over the need for career and possessions. Lucy reveals she abandoned Martha and is now attempting to get her back into her life, while she and Ted are also trying to have their own child. One night, Martha climbs into bed with Ted and Lucy while they are having sex, angering Ted and Lucy. Martha attempts to phone the cult because she misses them, accidentally finds out her friend Zoe is not on the farm with the cult, and hangs up when cult matriarch Katie answers using the code name "Marlene Miller."

In flashbacks, Martha recalls a series of disturbing events that led to her escape from the cult. She was originally recruited into the cult by Zoe. Martha was initially receptive but somewhat wary of Patrick, Katie, and Zoe. She was later convinced by Zoe and Patrick to let her guard down and "share herself", only to end up being drugged by Katie and brutally raped by Patrick; Katie and Zoe later explained to her that the rape was a cleansing ritual and told her she should be happy. Martha later "prepared" new initiate Sarah to be abused in the same way Katie had. Patrick urged Martha to kill a cat, which Martha refused. Her refusal prompted him to berate her for failing to follow the cult's ideals. Patrick constantly attempted to impregnate Martha to spread his genes, despite her resistance. Martha subsequently began participating in burglaries with the other cultists, including one where they murdered a homeowner who walked in on them. After witnessing the murder, Martha had a mental breakdown, to which Patrick responded by forcefully subduing her and berating her again; he then shifted to telling her that she was his favorite person and that he would never let her go.

Lucy and Ted host a party at their home, inviting numerous friends from the city. Martha is visibly nervous during the gathering. She has a psychotic episode when she misidentifies the bartender as a cult member; Lucy and Ted sedate her. Ted attempts to convince Lucy to send Martha to a psychiatric hospital, an idea Lucy rejects.

Later that night, Martha has a nightmare of being sexually abused by Patrick. Ted tries to calm her down, but Martha, thinking he is Patrick, kicks him down the staircase in a frightened panic.

Lucy threatens to send Martha to a psychiatric hospital, to which Martha angrily responds that Lucy will be a terrible mother. The next day, Lucy and Martha somewhat reconcile, and Martha goes swimming. She sees a man resembling Patrick watching her from the opposite shore.

When Martha departs for the psychiatric hospital with Lucy and Ted, the same man darts in front of their car on foot, then follows them in his black SUV as Martha watches from the back seat of the car.

== Cast ==
- Elizabeth Olsen as Martha / Marcy May / "Marlene Lewis"
- John Hawkes as Patrick
- Sarah Paulson as Lucy, Martha's older sister
- Hugh Dancy as Ted, Lucy's husband
- Brady Corbet as Watts
- Christopher Abbott as Max
- Michael Chmiel as Scruffy man
- Maria Dizzia as Katie / "Marlene Miller"
- Julia Garner as Sarah / Sally
- Louisa Krause as Zoe
- Adam David Thompson as Bartender "Mike"

== Production ==
Sean Durkin started writing the script of Martha Marcy May Marlene in 2007. When researching his script, Durkin read about what he calls "the big ones" of cults: Jonestown, the Manson family, the Unification Church of the United States and David Koresh. He realised he wanted to make something more experiential than political and downplayed the ideology and goals of the cult.

While researching, Durkin became fascinated by how someone gets into the farm, commune, or group, and he made a short film of the name Mary Last Seen about it, starring Brady Corbet, who plays cult recruiter Watts, in both the short and feature films. Mary Last Seen won the award for best short film at the 2010 Cannes Film Festival Directors' Fortnight. While Mary Last Seen was about how someone gets into the cult, Martha Marcy May Marlene was about what happens to someone when they exit. Durkin made the short to show the world Martha was in and also with the intent to send it out with the script for Martha Marcy May Marlene to potential investors. Mary Last Seen was selected for the Sundance Film Festival, and Durkin was given a distribution deal with Fox Searchlight Pictures.

Durkin and cinematographer Jody Lee Lipes were inspired by the films Rosemary's Baby, 3 Women, Klute, Interiors, and Margot at the Wedding. The look of the film was particularly inspired by the last film.

Elizabeth Olsen admitted that her nude scenes were a bit odd to film, but she said that simply diving into the water was far more perilous than taking her clothes off, in front of a camera, because "The lake was daunting, and in some lake scenes, we could only shoot once, because physically, it was too cold for a body to be in there very long."

== Release ==
Martha Marcy May Marlene premiered at the 2011 Sundance Film Festival in January, with Durkin winning the festival's U.S. Directing Award for Best Drama. It also screened in the Un Certain Regard section at the 2011 Cannes Film Festival and at the 36th Toronto International Film Festival on September 11, 2011. The film received a limited release in the United States on October 21, 2011.

In its opening weekend in limited release, Martha Marcy May Marlene grossed $137,651 in the United States. 20th Century Fox Home Entertainment released Martha Marcy May Marlene on DVD and Blu-ray on February 21, 2012.

== Reception ==
Martha Marcy May Marlene received positive reviews, with Olsen's performance as the traumatized Martha met with critical acclaim; the film holds a 90% "fresh" rating on Rotten Tomatoes, with the consensus capsule stating, "Led by a mesmerizing debut performance from Elizabeth Olsen, Martha Marcy May Marlene is a distinctive, haunting psychological drama." Metacritic, which uses a weighted average, assigned the film a score of 75 out of 100, based on 39 critics, indicating "generally favorable" reviews.

Christy Lemire of the Associated Press named Martha Marcy May Marlene the best film of 2011. Roger Ebert gave the film three-and-a-half out of four stars, describing Olsen as "a genuine discovery ... She has a wide range of emotions to deal with here, and in her first major role, she seems instinctively to know how to do that." Ebert's only major complaint was that the movie's chronological shifts were "a shade too clever. In a serious film, there is no payoff for trickery." In contrast, Peter Bradshaw of The Guardian felt that the flashbacks were "cleverly and indirectly" structured throughout the film, and ultimately rated it with four stars out of five.

== Accolades ==
Awards
Award	Category	Recipient(s)	Outcome
Alliance of Women Film Journalists	Best Breakthrough Performance	Elizabeth Olsen	Won
Alliance of Women Film Journalists	Best Supporting Actor	John Hawkes	Nominated
Austin Film Critics Association	Best Film		Nominated
Boston Society of Film Critics Awards	Best New Filmmaker	Sean Durkin	Won
Broadcast Film Critics Association Awards	Best Actress	Elizabeth Olsen	Nominated
Chicago Film Critics Association Awards	Most Promising Filmmaker	Sean Durkin	Won
Chicago Film Critics Association Awards	Most Promising Performer	Elizabeth Olsen	Won
Chicago Film Critics Association Awards	Best Actress	Elizabeth Olsen	Nominated
Chicago Film Critics Association Awards	Best Screenplay, Original	Sean Durkin	Nominated
Detroit Film Critics Society	Breakthrough Performance	Elizabeth Olsen	Nominated
Florida Film Critics Circle Awards	Pauline Kael Breakout Award	Elizabeth Olsen	Won
Ghent International Film Festival	Special Mention	Elizabeth Olsen	Won
Ghent International Film Festival	Grand Prix (Best Film)	Sean Durkin	Nominated
Gotham Awards	Best Ensemble Cast	Elizabeth Olsen, John Hawkes, Sarah Paulson, Hugh Dancy, Louisa Krause, Julia Garner, Brady Corbet, Maria Dizzia, Christopher Abbott	Nominated
Gotham Awards	Breakthrough Actress	Elizabeth Olsen	Nominated
Gotham Awards	Breakthrough Director	Sean Durkin	Nominated
Independent Spirit Awards	Best Female Lead	Elizabeth Olsen	Nominated
Independent Spirit Awards	Best First Feature	Antonio Campos (producer), Sean Durkin (director), Patrick Cunningham (producer), Josh Mond (producer), Chris Maybach (producer)	Nominated
Independent Spirit Awards	Best Supporting Male	John Hawkes	Nominated
Independent Spirit Awards	Producers Award	Josh Mond	Nominated
Los Angeles Film Critics Association Awards	New Generation Award	Sean Durkin, Antonio Campos, Josh Mond, Elizabeth Olsen	Won
Online Film Critics Society Awards	Best Editing	Zachary Stuart-Pontier	Nominated
Online Film Critics Society Awards	Best Lead Actress	Elizabeth Olsen	Nominated
Online Film Critics Society Awards	Best Original Screenplay	Sean Durkin	Nominated
Online Film Critics Society Awards	Best Supporting Actor	John Hawkes	Nominated
San Diego Film Critics Society Awards	Best Actress	Elizabeth Olsen	Nominated
Satellite Awards	Best Actress in a Motion Picture	Elizabeth Olsen	Nominated
St. Louis Gateway Film Critics Association Awards	Best Actress	Elizabeth Olsen	Nominated
St. Louis Gateway Film Critics Association Awards	Best Supporting Actor	John Hawkes	Nominated
Sundance Film Festival	Directing Award (Dramatic)	Sean Durkin	Won
Sundance Film Festival	Grand Jury Prize (Dramatic)	Sean Durkin	Nominated
Toronto Film Critics Association Awards	Best Actress	Elizabeth Olsen	Nominated
Toronto Film Critics Association Awards	Best First Feature	Sean Durkin	Nominated
Vancouver Film Critics Circle Award	Best Actress	Elizabeth Olsen	Won
Village Voice Film Poll	Best Actress	Elizabeth Olsen	Nominated
Washington DC Area Film Critics Association Awards	Best Actress	Elizabeth Olsen	Nominated
Washington DC Area Film Critics Association Awards	Best Supporting Actor	John Hawkes	Nominated

== Bibliography ==
- Vizcarrondo, Sara Maria, "Martha Marcy May Marlene", Box Office Magazine, September 12, 2011
- Zakarin, Jordan, "'Martha Marcy May Marlene' Director, Producers Talk Cults, Time Shifts & Elizabeth Olsen", The Huffington Post, September 12, 2011
