= Atlantiques =

2009 French-Senegalese documentary short film

- Directed by: Mati Diop
- Written by: Mati Diop
- Produced by: Corinne Castel; Frederic Papon
- Starring: Alpha Diop; Cheikh M'Baye; Ouli Seck; Serigne Seck
- Cinematography: Mati Diop
- Edited by: Nicolas Milteau
- Production companies: Anna Sanders Films; Le Fresnoy Studio National des Arts Contemporains
- Distributed by: The Criterion Channel
- Release date: June 2009 (Le Fresnoy Panorama)
- Running time: 16 minutes
- Country: France
- Language: Wolof
- Budget: €30,000 (estd.)

Atlantiques is a 2009 Franco-Senegalese short film directed by Mati Diop and co-produced by Corinne Castel and Frederic Papon. The film starring Alpha Diop, Cheikh M'Baye, Ouli Seck and Serigne Seck. The film deals with the demonic possession of a group of young women by their boyfriends who have drowned in an attempt to reach Europe. The story was later re-made as a feature by Diop in 2019.

The film has been shot in Dakar, Senegal. The film made its premier on 1 April 2011 in the United States. The film received mixed reviews from critics. At the Cinéma du Réel 2010, the film won the Louis Marcorelles Award - Mention. Then in the same year, the film won the Tiger Award for Short Film at the Rotterdam International Film Festival.

== Cast ==
- Alpha Diop
- Cheikh M'Baye
- Ouli Seck
- Serigne Seck
