= Simon Killer =

2012 film by António Campos

- Film poster
- Directed by: Antonio Campos
- Screenplay by: Antonio Campos
- Story by: Antonio Campos; Brady Corbet; Mati Diop
- Produced by: Josh Mond; Sean Durkin; Matt Palmieri
- Starring: Brady Corbet; Mati Diop
- Cinematography: Joe Anderson
- Edited by: Zac Stuart-Pontier; Antonio Campos; Babak Jalali
- Music by: Danny Bensi; Saunder Juriaans
- Production companies: FilmHaven Entertainment; Borderline Films
- Distributed by: IFC Films
- Release dates: January 20, 2012 (Sundance); April 12, 2013 (United States)
- Running time: 101 minutes
- Country: United States
- Languages: English; French
- Box office: $27,740

Simon Killer is a 2012 film directed by Antonio Campos with a screenplay by Campos from a story by Campos, Brady Corbet and Mati Diop. The film revolves around a young American man named Simon who is visiting Paris and his relationship with a Middle Eastern prostitute and a French woman he meets on the metro. It is a character study centering on Simon's sociopathic tendencies and their effects on the people that come into his life.

== Plot ==
After his girlfriend of five years, Michelle, leaves him when he aggressively accuses her of cheating on him, college graduate Simon takes a trip to Paris. He writes multiple emails to her expressing his desire for communication, but he insults her privately as he writes. He also lies to her about having met someone. After unsuccessfully trying to meet a girl the night before, Simon visits a bar/brothel where he meets prostitute Victoria. After some brief introductions, he pays to have sex with her, but only has her strip naked and grinds against her leg until he orgasms. She offers Simon her number so they can meet again.

They meet later and have sex. He later receives an email back from Michelle, where she expresses care for him but also tells him he now frightens her. On the day when he is supposed to leave the apartment he is staying at, scours a nearby train station for a person or people to beat and rob him. When he finds a group of thugs to do that, he lets them attack him and uses these excuses to stay at Victoria's place. While in bed together, she tells him in English about her abusive ex-husband, then in French about how she miscarried and her husband raped her before taking her to the hospital. Simon, his French poor, misunderstands as "You have a son."

The next day, Simon theorizes that most of Victoria's clients must be married, and suggests blackmailing them for money. They begin a romantic relationship. After an unsuccessful attempt to blackmail a cop, they find success in René, a man who pays them in exchange for their silence. Victoria quits her job at the bar. Simon encounters Marianne, a girl he met at the beginning of his trip, and gets her number. The cop tracks Victoria down and viciously beats her.

Simon goes out with Marianne and eventually kisses her. He calls René, claiming to need more money. Simon and Marianne have sex, but he initially makes her uncomfortable. While eating breakfast with her, he gets a call from Victoria asking where he is, and a call from René's wife, who says he is missing. When he goes to tell a fed-up Victoria this, she angrily tells him she called René's wife. In a rage, Simon beats her and strangles her. He tries to stay with Marianne, but eventually turns to family friend Carlo. He tearfully calls his mother, but hangs up before he can say anything.

At the airport, Simon writes a final mental letter to Michelle, stating the only way for them to heal is to distance themselves for a while. He promises to see her soon.

== Cast ==
- Brady Corbet as Simon
- Mati Diop as Victoria/Noura
- Nicolas Ronchi as Carlo
- Constance Rousseau as Marianne
- Lila Salet as Sophie
- Michaël Abiteboul as Jean
- Alexandra Neil as Simon's mom

== Reception ==
On review aggregator Rotten Tomatoes, the film holds an approval rating of 77% based on 60 reviews, with an average rating of 6.82/10. The website's critics consensus reads: "Though its bleak themes may be off-putting for some, Simon Killer is an engrossing, effective character study of a brutal, enigmatic figure." On Metacritic, the film has a weighted average score of 63 out of 100, based on 18 critics, indicating "generally favorable reviews".

Simon Killer was nominated for the Grand Jury Prize at the 2012 Sundance Film Festival.
