= Yaaba =

- Film poster
- Directed by: Idrissa Ouedraogo
- Written by: Idrissa Ouedraogo
- Screenplay by: Idrissa Ouédraogo
- Produced by: Arcadia Films, Les Films de l'avenir, Télévision suisse romande, Thelma Film AG
- Starring: Fatimata Sanga, Noufou Ouedraogo, Roukietou Barry, Adama Ouedraogo, Amadé Tour
- Cinematography: Matthias Kälin
- Edited by: Loredana Cristelli
- Music by: Francis Bebey
- Distributed by: New Yorker Films (U.S.)
- Release date: September 14, 1989 (TIFF)
- Running time: 90 minutes
- Countries: Burkina Faso; Switzerland; France
- Language: Mòoré
- Box office: $55,000

Yaaba is a 1989 Burkinabé drama film written, produced, and directed by Idrissa Ouedraogo, "one of the best known films from francophone sub-Saharan Africa". It won the Sakura Gold prize at the 1989 Tokyo Film Festival. The film was selected as the Burkinabé entry for the Best Foreign Language Film at the 62nd Academy Awards, but was not accepted as a nominee.

The film was the subject of a short documentary Parlons Grand-mère, which was shot during the film's production by Djibril Diop Mambéty.

== Plot ==
Burkina Faso's smallest village. The main character of the tale is 10-year-old Bila, who makes friends with Sana, an elderly woman. Everyone refers to her as "Witch," but Bila calls her "Yaaba" (grandmother). Sana's medicine is what keeps Bila's cousin Nopoko from dying when she becomes ill.

== Awards ==
- FIPRESCI Prize (Cannes, 1989)

== See also ==
- List of submissions to the 62nd Academy Awards for Best Foreign Language Film
- List of Burkinabé submissions for the Academy Award for Best Foreign Language Film
