= Badou Boy =

1970 Senegalese film

- Directed by: Djibril Diop Mambéty
- Written by: Djibril Diop Mambéty
- Produced by: Djibril Diop Mambéty
- Starring: Lamine Ba; Al Demba Ciss; Christoph Colomb; Aziz Diop Mambety
- Cinematography: Baidy Sow
- Edited by: Andree Blanchard
- Music by: Lalo Drame
- Production companies: Maag Daan; Studio Kankourama
- Distributed by: California Newsreel Productions
- Release date: 1970
- Running time: 56 minutes
- Country: Senegal
- Languages: Wolof; French

Badou Boy is a 1970 Senegalese film, directed by Djibril Diop Mambéty. The film follows the adventures of Badou Boy, a cheeky young man, as he travels through the streets of Dakar on the city buses.

== Plot ==
A sarcastic look at Senegal's capital that followed the adventures of what the director described as a "somewhat immoral street urchin who is very much like myself". The film is set against the backdrop of a bustling Dakar in the late 1960s. "Cop" believes "Boy" is a menace to society but he is merely a street kid trying to survive. As "Boy" leads "Cop" on a chase through the shantytowns to the city centre of Dakar, director Djibril Mambéty gives a nod to Charlie Chaplin's model of silent films. Mambéty was to return again and again to the theme of lonely people on the edge of society. The character of "Boy" stands out as particularly poignant. Mambéty also lays the basis for the profound critique of corrupting Western influences on Africa - a hallmark of his films.

== Reception ==
Badou Boy won the Silver Tanit award at the 1970 Carthage Film Festival in Tunisia. It was shown at the 1973 Cannes Film Festival.

Badou Boy remained unseen in the UK until 2006. It was instantly hailed as a lost classic. It premiered at the Africa in Motion Film Festival in October 2006 at the Filmhouse Cinema in Edinburgh.

A 4K restoration of this film premiered at the Museum of Modern Art in January 2022. The restoration was done by The Film Foundation’s World Cinema Project and Cineteca di Bologna at L’Immagine Ritrovata and L’Image Retrouvée laboratories from the 35mm internegative.

== Cast ==
- Lamine Bâ as Badou Boy
- Al Demba Ciss as Brigadier Al
- Christoph Colomb as Friend
- Aziz Diop Mambety as Landlord
