= Kakashi (album) =

Studio album by Yasuaki Shimizu
- Released: 1982
- Studio: Nippon Columbia (Tokyo)
- Genres: Jazz; electronica
- Length: 37:11
- Label: Better Days
- Producers: Yasuaki Shimizu; Aki Ikuta

Yasuaki Shimizu chronology
IQ 179 (1981)	Kakashi (1982)	Music for Commercials (1987)

Kakashi is a studio album by Japanese saxophonist and composer Yasuaki Shimizu. It was originally released in 1982 through the Better Days label. The album was recorded at Nippon Columbia Studios in Tokyo, while production was handled by Shimizu and Aki Ikuta.

The music on Kakashi melds genres including jazz, electronica, and synth-pop, among others. While the album was originally released only in Japan, a 2017 reissue on Palto Flats and WRWTFWW Records widely increased its availability outside of the country while attracting new attention and critical acclaim.

== Music ==
Pat Padua of Spectrum Culture has described Shimizu's approach on Kakashi (and throughout his career as a whole) as "borrow[ing] elements of all and any genres and transform[ing] it into something all his own." Critics have listed jazz, electronica, dub, synth-pop, and ambient among the genres integrated into the album. Shimizu plays a wide variety of instruments on the album in addition to his usual saxophone, including clarinet, flute, trumpet, percussion, and others. Other musicians on the album include Hideo Yamaki contributing various types of percussion and Morio Watanabe on bass.

"Suiren", the album's opening track, begins with what Padua describes as "a sampled loop that suggests an electronic meow" which then transitions into an "easy-going martial rhythm". Resident Advisor has called the track "jaunty jazz pop". Padua compares the title track to Japanese folk music, noting its "dreamy marimba" and "minimal rhythms" which "set up a foundation for brassy jazz figures and dissonant background fills". In a review of the album for Record Collector, Paul Bowler notes Shimizu's use of insect sounds. He highlights the use of "synthetic, cicada-like sounds" which "provide [a] scattershot background for Eno-esque piano runs" on "Kono Yoni Yomeri (Sono 1)". Bowler also notes that these sounds return "in real form" on "Kono Yoni Yomeri (Sono 2)", on which Shimizu "melds calm sax lines to the sound of summer-night bugs." Both Resident Advisor and Bowler consider "Semi Tori No Hi" a highlight of the album; the former notes the track "alternates between placid new age vibes—shimmering chimes, strummed harps—and soulful horn bursts."

Opening the album's second side, "Yume Dawa" features horn playing by Shimizu which has compared to the earlier work of the Lounge Lizards. Resident Advisor considers "Umi No Ue Kara", the album's longest track, to be its "most intriguing". The publication compares its drumming to that of dub music, while crediting the percussion, along with the track's marimba and "muttered vocals", with creating a "mellow mood." The album's closing track, "Utsukushiki Tennen", is the only piece not written by Shimizu, having been composed by Hozumi Tanaka.

== Release and reception ==
Kakashi was originally released exclusively in Japan, as was a 2016 reissue of the album. The album was finally released outside of the country in November 2017 on Palto Flats and WRWTFWW Records. Its cover features an illustration by Shimizu.

Kakashi has received positive reviews from critics. In Bowler's review for Record Collector, he gave the album a four-star rating, noting its meld of genres and similarities with the acclaimed Utakata No Hibi (1983) by Mariah (of which Shimizu was a member). Resident Advisor has also compared the album to Utakata No Hibi, stating that Shimizu's ability to integrate various sounds together "make the album as a whole seem wholly of its own moment." In Padua's review for Spectrum Culture he states that "on any given track, Kakashi is likely to shift from ambient to jazz to Japanese folk to some hybrid impossible to label, and that is part of the joy of such music." In a review of Shimizu's 2022 album Kiren for Pitchfork, Joshua Minsoo Kim referred to Kikashi as a "major standout" of his career, describing it as a "thrilling crystallization of [Shimizu's] poppier, melodic inclinations."

== Track listing ==
All tracks are written by Yasuaki Shimizu, except "Utsukushiki Tennen" by Hozumi Tanaka.

Side one
No.	Title	Length
1.	"Suiren" ("睡 蓮")	4:36
2.	"Kakashi" ("案山子")	4:45
3.	"Kono Yoni Yomeri (Sono 1)" ("このように詠めり (その 1)")	3:00
4.	"Semi Tori No Hi" ("セミ取りの日")	4:36
5.	"Kono Yoni Yomeri (Sono 2)" ("このように詠めり (その 2)")	2:20
Total length:		19:17

Side two
No.	Title	Length
1.	"Yume Dewa" ("夢では")	4:49
2.	"Umi No Ue Kara" ("海の上から")	8:19
3.	"Utsukushiki Tennen" ("美しき天然")	4:46
Total length:		17:54

== Personnel ==
=== Musicians ===
- Yasuaki Shimizu – vocals, saxophone, clarinet, flute, trumpet, piano, mallets, drums, percussion, charango, electronics, tapes, toys, noises
- Hideo Yamaki – trap drums, bass drum, chanchiki, percussion (1, 2, 8)
- Morio Watanabe – bass (1, 2, 7, 8), engawa, balafon, wind bells (8)
- Takayuki Hijikata – guitar (1)
- Masanori Sasaji – marimba (2)
- Aki Ikuta – bass (6), guitar (7)
- Junichi "Donpei" Kanezaki – trumpet (2, 8)
- Johnny Barrett – Frenchman and Irishman (2)
- Koji Yamaguchi – French horn (1)
- Mitsuru Orikasa – cello (1)
- Tomio Yajima – cello (2)

=== Technical ===
- Yasuaki Shimizu – production
- Aki Ikuta – production
- Seigen Ono – engineering
- Greg Calbi – mastering

=== Production staff ===
- Kenichi Kishi
- Tomoki Magota
- Masashi Sasamoto
- Kiyoshi Ozama
- Paul Aoyama
- Toshiaki Ota

=== Packaging ===
- Yasuaki Shimizu – painting
- Aki Ikuta – photo, design
- Shadrack Linda – insert, label layout
