= Touki Bouki =

1973 Senegalese film

- 2005 DVD cover
- Directed by: Djibril Diop Mambéty
- Written by: Djibril Diop Mambéty
- Starring: Magaye Niang; Mareme Niang
- Cinematography: Pap Samba Sow
- Edited by: Siro Asteni; Emma Mennenti
- Music by: Josephine Baker; Mado Robin; Aminata Fall
- Production companies: Cinegrit; Studio Kankourama
- Distributed by: World Cinema Foundation
- Release date: 1973
- Running time: 91 minutes
- Country: Senegal
- Language: Wolof
- Budget: $30,000

Touki Bouki (pronounced [t̺ukˑi bukˑi], Wolof for The Journey of the Hyena) is a 1973 Senegalese drama film written and directed by Djibril Diop Mambéty. It was screened at the 1973 Cannes Film Festival and the 8th Moscow International Film Festival.

In 2008, Touki Bouki was restored by the World Cinema Foundation at the Cineteca di Bologna / L'Immagine Ritrovata Laboratory. In 2022, it was ranked as the 66th greatest film of all time in the Sight and Sound Critic's Poll.

== Plot ==
Mory, a cowherd who rides a motorcycle adorned with a bull-horned skull, meets Anta, a student, in Dakar. Disillusioned and weary of life in Senegal, they dream of escaping to Paris and devise various schemes to raise money for their journey.

Mory eventually succeeds in stealing money and a large amount of clothing from the home of a wealthy homosexual man while he is showering. With the stolen funds, Anta and Mory purchase tickets for a ship to France. However, their victim alerts the police, who begin to pursue the duo.

As Anta and Mory board the ship at the Port of Dakar, a loudspeaker announcement summons Mory to meet the captain. Upon hearing this, Mory panics, abandons Anta, and flees in search of his bull-horned motorcycle, only to discover that it has been destroyed in a crash that nearly killed the rider who had taken it.

The ship departs with Anta, leaving Mory behind. He sits on the ground next to his hat, staring despondently at the wreckage of his motorcycle.

== Cast ==
- Aminata Fall as Aunt Oumy
- Ousseynou Diop as Charlie
- Magaye Niang as Mory
- Mareme Niang as Anta

== Production ==
Based on his own story and script, Djibril Diop Mambéty made Touki Bouki with a budget of $30,000 – obtained in part from the Senegalese government. Though influenced by French New Wave, Touki Bouki displays a style all its own. Its camerawork and soundtrack have a frenetic rhythm uncharacteristic of most African films – known for their often deliberately slow-paced, linearly evolving narratives. However, it has been asserted that the jump cuts and radical spatial shifts of the film are inspired by African oral traditions. The word "Bouki" in the title refers to a popular folk character, known for causing mischief and cheating his way to what he wants. Through jump cuts, colliding montage, dissonant sonic accompaniment, and the juxtaposition of premodern, pastoral and modern sounds and visual elements, Touki Bouki conveys and grapples with the hybridization of Senegal.

West African cinema contemporaneous with Touki Bouki was primarily financed and distributed by the French Ministry of Cooperation's Bureau du Cinema, which ensured that scripts had to conform to cinematographic standards acceptable to the French Government. Touki Bouki, in contrast, was made without any French financial assistance, allowing Mambéty relatively significant autonomy in production of the film. Mambéty's ready adoption of French New Wave techniques was to a degree motivated by meagre financial resources, circumstances similar to those of the film-makers of the early French New Wave. Narrative and cinematographic techniques associated with the Western genre (known for dehumanizing depictions of Native Americans and minorities) were also subversively utilized by Mambéty in the production of the film.

During the production of Touki Bouki, Mambéty was arrested for participating in anti-racist protests in Rome, and bailed out by lawyers from the Italian Communist Party after appeals from friends such as Bernardo Bertolucci and Sophia Loren. The experience of receiving a request from the Italian Communist Party to compensate them for the legal fees spent in his defence served as an inspiration for a character in his later film, Hyènes.

== Awards ==
- International Critics Award at 1973 Cannes Film Festival
- Special Jury Award at 1973 Moscow Film Festival
- Touki Bouki ranked #52 in Empire magazine's "The 100 Best Films Of World Cinema" in 2010.

== Home media and restoration ==
In 2005, Touki Bouki was released on DVD by Kino Video.

In 2008, the film was restored in 2K by the Cineteca di Bologna/L'Immagine Ritrovata laboratory, in association with the Martin Scorsese-founded World Cinema Project. In 2013, the restoration of the film was released on DVD and Blu-ray by The Criterion Collection, as part of the Martin Scorsese's World Cinema Project box set. In 2021, the Criterion Collection re-issued the film on DVD and Blu-ray as a standalone release.

== Legacy ==
In 2014, British band Red Snapper released Hyena, an album inspired by Touki Bouki and featuring a cover image from the film.

"inspired by the band's recent soundtrack for cult 70s Senegalese road movie Touki Bouki, the first independent African film which was recently restored by Martin Scorcese [sic] and which is first and foremost an afro-funk odyssey in itself. Have toured with the film for a year, playing the soundtrack live to audiences across Europe; themes from the score have been developed and extended to form Hyena."

Beyoncé and Jay-Z referenced the bull-horned motorcycle of Touki Bouki in the promotional video and poster for their 2018 On the Run II Tour.

== See also ==
- Cinema of Senegal
