= The Astronomer's Dream =

1898 French film

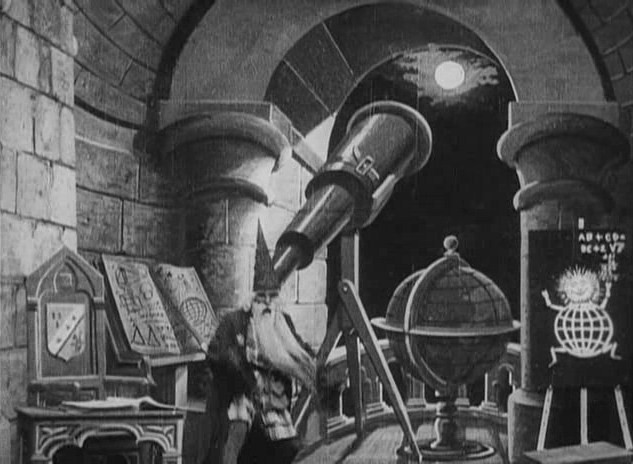
- A scene from the film
- Directed by: Georges Méliès
- Based on: "Les Farces de la Lune ou les Mésaventures de Nostradamus" by Georges Méliès
- Starring: Georges Méliès
- Release date: 1898
- Running time: Approx. 3 minutes
- Country: France
- Language: Silent

The Astronomer's Dream, or the Man in the Moon (French: La Lune à un mètre, literally "The Moon from One Meter Off") is an 1898 French silent trick film by Georges Méliès. Based on one of his stage magic acts, and starring Méliès himself, the film presents a varied assortment of images dreamed by an astronomer, focusing on themes of astronomy and especially the Moon.

== Plot summary ==
A surviving print of the film

In an observatory, a medieval astronomer is studying at his desk. Satan appears, followed by Phoebe (Diana) who makes him vanish before disappearing herself. The astronomer draws a globe on a blackboard. The globe develops a sun-like head and limbs and starts to move on the blackboard. Objects the astronomer attempts to interact with transform or move away from him. The Moon suddenly appears in the building as a large face, eating the astronomer's telescope. Two small clowns tumble from its mouth, but the upset astronomer throws them back in. As the astronomer attempts to attack the Moon, it instantly moves back to the sky. All objects the astronomer tries to use to attack the Moon vanish in thin air.

Once the astronomer sits back down, the Moon becomes a crescent and a mythological goddess appears from it. The astronomer attempts to embrace her, but she flies up to the sky. A woman appears in the crescent of the Moon and reclines into its C shape, but as the astronomer tries to reach her, the Moon appears as a prominent face again and he inadvertently jumps into its mouth. The moon spits out distinct body parts of the astronomer. Satan reappears, but he is sent away again by Phoebe. She quickly puts the astronomer back together, piece by piece. Then, in the observatory, the astronomer wakes up.

== Production ==
Méliès plays the astronomer in the film, which is based on a stage magic sketch he had presented in 1891 at his Paris magic venue, the Théâtre Robert-Houdin. The stage version, "Les Farces de la Lune ou les Mésaventures de Nostradamus" (translation: "The Farces of the Moon or the Misadventures of Nostradamus"), combined theatrical illusions with shadow puppetry. The film version uses a combination of stage machinery (including the giant puppet Moon face), pyrotechnics, and substitution splices for its illusions. Phoebe, goddess of the moon, was played by Jehanne d'Alcy, whom Méliès would marry some 30 years later. The two small clowns are played by the same children who had appeared in Méliès's film The Famous Box Trick, earlier that year.

== Release ==
The Astronomer's Dream was released by Méliès's Star Film Company and is numbered 160–162 in its catalogues. In the French catalogues, a subtitle divided the film into three scenes: La Lune à un mètre (1—l'observatoire; 2—la Lune; 3—Phœbé). The film was Méliès's third, after The Haunted Castle (1896) and The Laboratory of Mephistopheles (1897), to be longer than 60 meters.

When the film was imported to the United States by producer Sigmund Lubin in 1899, he retitled it A Trip to the Moon. However, it should not be confused with Méliès's 1902 film A Trip to the Moon.
