= Yasuaki Shimizu =

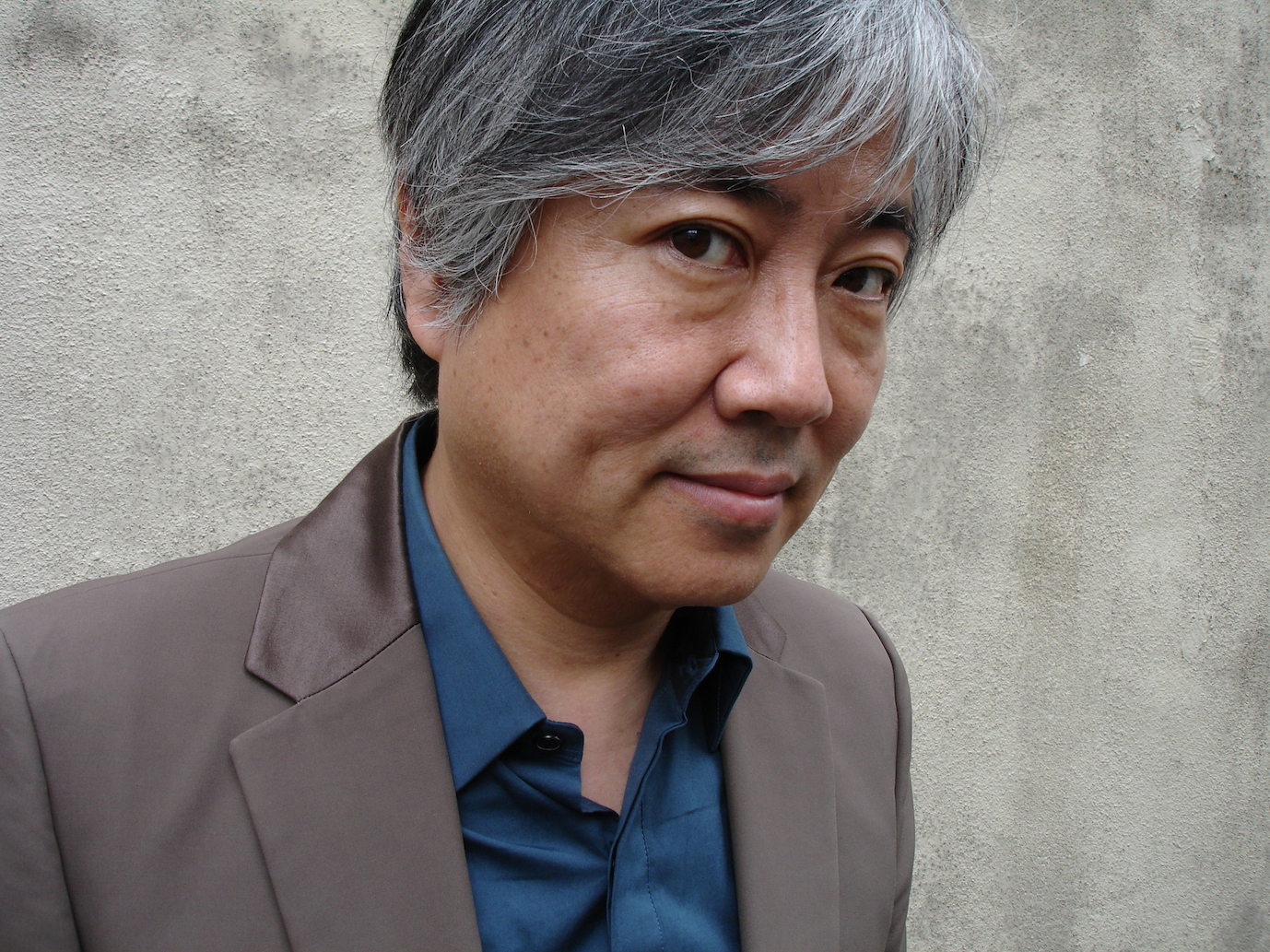

Background information
- Born: August 9, 1954 (age 72); Shimada, Shizuoka, Japan
- Origin: Japan
- Genres: Jazz, classical
- Occupations: Composer, saxophonist, producer
- Instrument: Tenor saxophone
- Years active: 1970s–present
- Label: Victor Entertainment
- Formerly of: Saxophonettes, Mariah
- Website: www.yasuaki-shimizu.com

Yasuaki Shimizu (清水靖晃, Shimizu Yasuaki) (born 9 August 1954) is a Japanese composer, saxophonist and producer. He is known for his interpretations of the music of J.S. Bach, in particular the "Cello Suites 1-6" re-arranged for and performed on tenor saxophone.

Since 1981 he has composed, produced or arranged for artists as diverse as jazz vocalist Helen Merrill, composer Ryuichi Sakamoto, and DJ Towa Tei. During this time he has lived in London, Paris and Tokyo.

== Life and career ==
=== Early career ===
Shimizu’s career as a saxophone player took off in the 1970s. He released his first solo album, Get You, in 1978 and from 1980 won a following with his experimental rock band Mariah, with whom he released five albums.

Mariah’s final recording Utakata no Hibi (1983) weaved traditional Japanese festival rhythms with rock tempos and sounds. Over the same period Shimizu recorded solo albums including IQ 179 (1981) and Kakashi (1982), which built on the alternative-music foundations set down by Mariah.

From these beginnings Shimizu’s delight in pushing boundaries is apparent in such projects as the satellite link-up performance of Bye Bye Kipling with Ryuichi Sakamoto for a Nam June Paik happening (1986), or his enigmatic, solo “live installation” as a Human Cuckoo Clock in Tokyo (2002).

=== The Saxophonettes I ===
In 1983, he created the Yasuaki Shimizu & Saxophonettes project—initially a one-man band—which has since become the main focus of his recording activities. His first recording as the Saxophonettes was L'Automne à Pékin (1983), a tribute to the Golden Age of Hollywood: classic soundtrack-flavored tunes rendered with a combination of lush yet minimal orchestration and layered electronic sounds laid over reggae bass and drums.

This was followed by Stardust (1985), Latin (1991) and Time and Again (1993); the latter revisiting the textures of L'Automne à Pékin with original compositions highlighting Shimizu’s orchestral arrangements and his tenor saxophone.

The Saxophonettes project released Shimizu’s landmark Cello Suites albums in 1996 (nos 1-3) and 1999 (nos 4-6). These were reissued in 2007 as a two-disc set (nos 1-6).

=== Europe ===
From 1985 through 1991 Shimizu divided his time between Paris and London, making his contribution to the multicultural and re-energized European music scene by recording, collaborating and performing with various international artists. His experiences over this period also gave him an altogether new perspective on his own musical roots.

He made three albums: Subliminal (1987) with French producer Martin Meissonnier, Dementos (1988) with various British artists including ex-Flying Lizards David Cunningham, and Aduna (1989) with Senegalese vocalist Wasis Diop, whose 1994 album No Sant Shimizu co-produced.

=== Bach recordings ===
Shimizu has paid attention to recording and studio techniques.

In 1997 his mini-album Bach Box won the Best Production prize at the 39th annual Japan Record Awards. This recording, while expressing the highest respect for the baroque master, revisited Bach’s music with an audacious approach to form and flashes of wit, interweaving the original musical structures with treated voices and intermittent sine wave signals.

On his Cello Suites projects Shimizu utilized unconventional acoustic environments, which he selected for their high degree of reverberation—an underground quarry, a mine in Japan, a palazzo in Italy—in order to “play the space” as a resonating instrument.

This approach is also reflected in his "Bach-Saxophone-Space" concert series performed at such locations as Kodaiji Temple in Kyoto in 1996 (Osaka Shinbun 6 Dec 1996), the Niitsu, Genichiro-Inokuma and Mito art museums between 2000 and 2003, and an underground car park in Shibuya (Mainichi Daily Sept 1997), Tokyo (1997).

=== The Saxophonettes II ===
In 2006, Shimizu made his playful one-man-band concept of the Saxophonettes into a real-life quintet, featuring Ryoko Egawa, Hirokazu Hayashida, Ryota Higashi and Hiroshi Suzuki in an ensemble of three tenor and two baritone saxophones.

Their album Pentatonica (2007) transcends genre limitations in a recording based on the five-note pentatonic scale. Featuring new compositions as well as arrangements of Ethiopian traditional music, it displays Shimizu's individuality: from his choice of recording locations and painstaking approach to sound production, to the immediacy of live performance conveyed through the interplay between musicians.

Beyond recording, the group has performed extensively in Japan as well as in Moscow, Havana and Hong Kong, with other tours in the works.

At a performance in Tokyo (2010) commissioned by Sumida Triphony Hall, Shimizu reaffirmed his passion for Bach by premiering the world’s first saxophone/contrabass arrangement of Bach's Goldberg Variations, adding four contrabasses to his saxophone quintet. He went on to hone the arrangement for release as the album Goldberg Variations in 2015.

=== Film and TV ===
Shimizu with his band Mariah had composed soundtracks for the anime series The New Adventures of Gigantor in 1980/1981. He created music for Juliet Berto's Havre (1985), Oscar-winner Yōjirō Takita’s We Are Not Alone (1993), three films by Mitsuo Yanagimachi including most recently Who's Camus Anyway? (2006), and contributed a piece to Peter Greenaway's Pillow Book (1996). He also wrote the score for the Oscar-nominated and award-winning documentary Cutie and the Boxer (2013) by Zachary Heinzerling.

He has composed soundtracks for Hiroyuki Nakano's art video Issey Miyake Dancing Pleats (1993), the feature film Stereo Future (2000) and in 2008 the two short films Ferris Wheel at 3:03:15 PM, and Seven Samurai.

The album Music for Commercials, a collection of his melodies aired as TV jingles, was released in 1987. He authored the “sound identity” for TV film channel Cinefil Imagica, then released an album of related tracks entitled Cinefil (2001).

He wrote scores for a number TV dramas, plus a documentary and experimental film for the Japanese national broadcaster NHK TV. In 2007 NHK adopted his music for the educational series Mathematica II. His 2014 soundtrack to the dramatization of Ryu Murakami's Gojūgo-sai kara no Harōraifu (Finding Life After 55) was later released as an album.

A major event in 2008 saw Shimizu compose music for a one-off screening of the newly restored 1925 silent film Orochi, a samurai “chambara” sword-fighting drama. He performed this “live soundtrack” with the Saxophonettes and a 23-piece orchestra inside the grounds of Meiji Shrine in Tokyo.

He has worked with iconic Japanese comedian and director Hitoshi Matsumoto, scoring the films Symbol (2009) and Scabbard Samurai (2011).

=== Collaborations ===
Shimizu’s partnerships with video, multimedia, and dance artists include commissions for Mao Kawaguchi’s video installations La Cite Délire (1987) and Niwa (1992), the performances by butoh dancer Goro Namerikawa Kioku no Gekijo (1990) and Flaneur vol. 5 (1997), and the Simon James art installations Look Don't Touch (1998), and Chasing Light (2002).

In 2004 he composed music for the sound installations featured in “Dream Garden Factory,” a landscape of six gardens with different themes at the Pacific Flora 2004 expo. Excerpts from the installation were released on the album Seventh Garden (2004).

Between 2006 and 2007, his concerts with the Saxophonettes at venues in Tokyo and Osaka featured as guest artist the contemporary dancer Masako Yasumoto.

In 2012 Shimizu collaborated with media artist Masaki Fujihata on his project Voices of Aliveness, a multimedia public recording, installation and performance for the Estuaire Biennale in Nantes, France. The work won the Award of Distinction at the Prix Ars Electronica.

As a composer-producer-arranger, he has collaborated with artists as diverse as Japanese enka balladeer Saburo Kitajima, composers Ryuichi Sakamoto and Koji Ueno, jazz vocalists Helen Merrill and Karin Krog, guitarist Kazumi Watanabe, French pop singer Pierre Barouh, and DJ Towa Tei. He has also contributed to recordings by trumpeter Toshinori Kondo, DJ Dee Nasty, Björk and others.

Live collaborations include appearances with Bill Laswell, Elvin Jones, Yosuke Yamashita, Van Dyke Parks, Urban Sax, Manu Dibango, David Cunningham and Carl Stone.

From 1991 to 1994 he teamed up with ex-YMO artist Haruomi Hosono to produce the Tokyo Mura Mura Festival, presenting improbable line-ups of talents such as Michael Nyman, John Zorn, Julee Cruise, and The Orb.

== Discography ==
=== Yasuaki Shimizu ===
- Get You (1978)
- Mariah (1979)
- Far East Express (1979)
- Berlin (1980)
- IQ 179 (1981)
- Kakashi (1982)
- Music for Commercials (1987) Compilation of jingles for TV commercials
- Subliminal (1987)
- Dementos (1988)
- Aduna (1989)
- Shadow of China (1990) Film soundtrack
- Pao-Jiang-Hu (1995) Film documentary soundtrack
- X (1996) Film soundtrack
- Juvenile (2000) Film soundtrack
- Cinefil (2001) Compilation from the film channel Cinefil Imagica
- Stereo Future (2001) Film soundtrack (Various Artists: disc 1 Yasuaki Shimizu)
- Seventh Garden (2004) Excerpts from Pacific Flora 2004: Dream Garden Factory sound installation
- One Hundred (2009) Live recording with David Cunningham
- Felt (2010) with Keichiro Shibuya
- 55-sai Kara no Hello Life (2014) TV drama soundtrack
- SYO (2014) with Hideo Yamaki, Gen Ogimi
- Kiren (2022)

=== Yasuaki Shimizu & Saxophonettes ===
- L’Automne à Pekin (1983)
- Stardust (1985)
- Latin (1991)
- Time and Again (1993)
- Suite1 (1996)
- Cello Suites 1.2.3 (1996)
- From the Cello Suites (1996)
- Bach Box (1997) Prize for Best Production, 39th Japan Record Awards
- Cello Suites 4.5.6 (1999)
- Cello Suites (2003) DVD-Audio
- Pentatonica (2007)
- Cello Suites (2007) Cello Suites 1.2.3 and Cello Suites 4.5.6 reissued as double album
- Goldberg Variations (2015)

=== Mariah ===
- Yen Tricks (1980)
- Auschwitz Dream (1981)
- Marginal Love (1981)
- Red Party (1982)
- Utakata no Hibi (1983)
