= Hyenas (1992 film) =

Senegalese film

- film poster
- Directed by: Djibril Diop Mambéty
- Written by: Djibril Diop Mambéty
- Based on: The Visit (1956 play) by Friedrich Dürrenmatt
- Produced by: Pierre-Alain Meier; Alain Rozanès
- Starring: Ami Diakhate
- Cinematography: Matthias Kälin
- Edited by: Loredana Cristelli
- Music by: Wasis Diop
- Distributed by: California Newsreel Productions
- Release date: 18 September 1992 (TIFF)
- Running time: 110 minutes
- Country: Senegal
- Language: Wolof

Hyenas (French: Hyènes) is a 1992 Senegalese film adaptation of Friedrich Dürrenmatt's Swiss-German satirical tragicomedy play The Visit (1956), directed by Djibril Diop Mambéty. The intimate story of love and revenge parallels a critique of neocolonialism and African consumerism. It was entered into the 1992 Cannes Film Festival.

== Plot ==
Hyenas tells the story of Linguere Ramatou, an aging, wealthy woman who revisits her home village of Colobane. Linguere offers a disturbing proposition to the people of Colobane and lavishes luxuries upon them to persuade them. This embittered woman, "as rich as the World Bank", will bestow upon Colobane a fortune in exchange for the murder of Dramaan Drameh, the man who wronged her.

== Cast ==
- Ami Diakhate as Linguère Ramatou
- Djibril Diop Mambéty as Gaana
- Mansour Diouf as Dramaan Drameh
- Calgou Fall as the priest
- Faly Gueye as Mme. Drameh
- Mamadou Mahourédia Gueye as the Mayor
- Issa Ramagelissa Samb as the professor

== Critical response ==
Critical response to the film was mostly positive. On the review aggregator website Rotten Tomatoes, 91% of 11 critics' reviews are positive. Hyenas was nominated for the Palme d'Or at the 1992 Cannes Film Festival.

- "A timeless story...The strong story line and fine ensemble acting provide a faster, more easily assimilated rhythm than many African films." - Variety
- "This pungent film adaptation's change of locale lends the tale a new political dimension...(Mambety) inflects the grim drama with an edge of carnival humor. This film carries a sting!" - The New York Times
- "This wicked tale, told with wit and irony, has all the ingredients of a crowd-pleaser." - The Village Voice
- "Funnier and warmer than Dürrenmatt ever dared to be but with the tale's bleak, ominous edges still in evidence." - New York Newsday
