= Le Franc =

- Directed by: Djibril Diop Mambéty
- Written by: Djibril Diop Mambéty
- Produced by: Silvia Voser
- Cinematography: Stéphan Oriach
- Edited by: Stéphan Oriach
- Music by: Issa Cissokho; Dieye Ma Dieye
- Production company: Waka Films
- Distributed by: California Newsreel Productions
- Release dates: August 1994 (Locarno): September 11, 1995 (Toronto)
- Running time: 45 minutes
- Country: Senegal
- Language: Wolof

Le Franc is a 1994 Senegalese comedy film, directed by Djibril Diop Mambéty.

Le Franc is about Marigo, a penniless musician living in a shanty town, relentlessly harassed by his formidable landlady.

This film uses the French government's 50% devaluation of the West African CFA franc in 1994, and the resulting hardships as the basis for a whimsical commentary on using the lottery for survival.

Le Franc was originally intended as the first film of a trilogy under the title, Tales of Ordinary People. However, Mambety’s untimely death in 1998 prevented the completion of the third film.

== Synopsis ==
Marigo the musician dreams with his instrument – a congoma – confiscated by his landlady because he never pays the rent. He gets hold of a lottery ticket and decides to put it in a safe place while he waits for the draw: he glues it to the back of his door. The night of the draw, fortune blinds Marigo, he is the proud owner of the winning ticket. He already sees himself as a millionaire, with a thousand congomas, an orchestra and a private plane… He even has visions of the charismatic Aminata Fall, symbol of capitalism in Africa. But there is small problem; the ticket is glued to the door…

== Cast ==
- Demba Bâ as "Dwarf"
- Dieye Ma Dieye as "Marigo"
- Aminata Fall as "Landlady"

== Release ==
Le Franc was released on DVD coupled with La petite vendeuse de Soleil (The Little Girl who Sold the Sun) and is distributed by California Newsreel Productions.
