= Djibril Diop Mambéty =

Senegalese filmmaker (1945–1998)

- Born: January 23, 1945; Colobane, Dakar, Senegal
- Died: July 23, 1998 (aged 53); Paris, France
- Occupations: film director, actor, orator, composer and poet.
- Notable work: Touki Bouki
- Relatives: Wasis Diop; Mati Diop

Djibril Diop Mambéty (January 23, 1945 – July 23, 1998) was a Senegalese film director, actor, orator, composer and poet. Though he made only five feature films and two short documentary films, they received international acclaim for their original and experimental cinematic technique and non-linear, unconventional narrative style.

Born to a Muslim family near Dakar, Senegal's capital city, Mambéty was an ethnic Wolof. He died in 1998 while being treated for lung cancer in a Paris hospital.

== Biography ==
Djibril Diop Mambéty was born in Colobane, Senegal, a town near Senegal's capital city of Dakar that he would feature prominently in some of his films. Mambéty was the son of a Muslim cleric and member of the Lebou tribe. Mambéty's interest in cinema began with theater. Having graduated from acting school in Senegal, Mambéty worked as a stage actor at the Daniel Sorano National Theater in Dakar until he was expelled for disciplinary reasons.

In 1969, at age 23, without any formal training in filmmaking, Mambéty directed and produced his first short film, Contras' City (City of Contrasts). The following year Mambéty made another short, Badou Boy, which won the Silver Tanit award at the 1970 Carthage Film Festival in Tunisia.

Mambéty's technically sophisticated and richly symbolic first feature-length film, Touki Bouki (1973), received the International Critics Award at Cannes Film Festival and won the Special Jury Award at the Moscow Film Festival, bringing the Senegalese director international attention and acclaim. Despite the film's success, nearly twenty years passed before Mambéty made another feature film. During this hiatus he made one short film in 1989, Parlons Grandmère (Let's talk Grandmother), about the making of Idrissa Ouedraogo's film Yaaba.

Hyènes (1992), Mambéty's second and final feature film, was an adaptation of Friedrich Dürrenmatt's play The Visit and was conceptualized as a continuation of Touki Bouki. At the time of his death, the film director had been working on a trilogy of short films called Contes des Petites Gens (Tales of the Little People). The first of the three films was Le Franc (1994). At the time of his death Mambéty had been editing the second film of that series, La Petite Vendeuse de Soleil (The Little Girl Who Sold the Sun), which premiered posthumously in 1999.

On July 23, 1998, Mambéty died of lung cancer at age 53 at a hospital in Paris, France.

He was the subject of a 2008 documentary film Mambéty For Ever.

== Film career ==
=== Contras'city ===
Djibril Diop Mambéty's earliest film, a short entitled Contras'city (1968), highlighted the contrasts of cosmopolitanism and unrestrained ostentation in Dakar's baroque architecture against the modest, everyday lives of the Senegalese. Mambéty's recurrent theme of hybridity—the blending of elements from precolonial Africa and the colonial West in a neocolonial African context—is already evident in Contras'city, which is considered Africa's first comedy film.

=== Badou Boy ===
In 1970 Mambéty released his next short, Badou Boy, another sarcastic look at Senegal's capital that followed the adventures of what the director described as a "somewhat immoral street urchin who is very much like myself". The contest pits the non-conformist individual against an absurdly caricatured policeman who pursues the protagonist through comedically improbable scenarios. Badou Boy celebrates an urban subculture while parodying the state.

=== Touki Bouki ===
Considered by many to be his most daring and important film, Mambéty's feature-length debut, Touki Bouki (The Hyena's Journey) more fully developed his earlier themes of hybridity and individual marginality and isolation. Based on his own story and script, Djibril Diop Mambéty made Touki Bouki with a budget of $30,000—obtained in part from the Senegalese government. Though influenced by French New Wave, Touki Bouki displays a style all its own. Its camerawork and soundtrack have a frenetic rhythm uncharacteristic of most African films—known for their often deliberately slow-paced, linearly evolving narratives. Through jump cuts, colliding montage, dissonant sonic accompaniment, and the juxtaposition of premodern, pastoral and modern sounds and visual elements, Touki Bouki conveys and grapples with the hybridization of Senegal. A pair of lovers, Mory and Anta, fantasize about fleeing Dakar for a mythic and romanticized France. The film follows them as they try to scavenge and hustle the funds for their escape. They both make it to the steamliner that would transport them to Paris, but before it disembarks, Mory is drawn back to Dakar and cannot succumb to the seduction of the West. Touki Bouki won the Special Jury Award at the Moscow film Festival and the International Critics Award at Cannes.

- Touki Bouki ranked #52 in Empire magazines "The 100 Best Films Of World Cinema" in 2010.

=== Hyènes ===
An African adaptation of Friedrich Dürrenmatt's famous Swiss play, The Visit, Hyènes (Hyenas) tells the story of Linguere Ramatou, an aging, wealthy woman who revisits her home village—and Mambéty's—of Colobane. Linguere offers a disturbing proposition to the people of Colobane and lavishes luxuries upon them to persuade them. This embittered woman, "as rich as the World Bank," will bestow upon Colobane a fortune in exchange for the murder of Dramaan Drameh, a local shopkeeper who abandoned her after a love affair and her illegitimate pregnancy when she was 16. The intimate story of love and revenge between Linguere and Dramaan parallels a critique of neocolonialism and African consumerism. Mambéty once said, "We have sold our souls too cheaply. We are done for if we have traded our souls for money" Although its characters are distinct, Mambéty considered Hyènes to be a continuation of Touki Bouki and a further exploration of its themes of power and insanity. Wasis Diop, younger brother of Djibril Diop Mambéty, is responsible for the film's soundtrack. The film is distributed by California Newsreel Productions.

=== Le Franc ===
This first film in Mambéty's uncompleted trilogy, Contes des Petites Gens (Tales of Little People), Le Franc (1994) uses the French government's devaluation of the CFA Franc to comment on the absurd schemes people concoct to survive a system that rewards greed rather than merit. The film features a poor musician, Marigo, who finds solace in playing his congoma, which has been confiscated because of his debt. Marigo plays the lottery, and despite winning, encounters obstacles to claiming the reward. The film is both slapstick and symbolic of the lottery-style luck that benefits some and hampers others in the global economy. Le Franc is part of the project, Three Tales from Senegal which also includes "Picc Mi" (Little Bird) and "Fary l'anesse" (Fary the Donkey). The film is distributed by California Newsreel Productions.

=== La Petite Vendeuse de Soleil ===
As the second installment in Mambéty's trilogy exalting the lives and promise found among ordinary Senegalese, the 45-minute film, La Petite Vendeuse de Soleil (The Little Girl Who Sold the Sun) depicts a young beggar girl, Sili, who on crutches, confidently makes her way through a city of obstacles, evading a group of bullies, and selling newspapers to make money for herself and her blind grandmother. Mambéty dedicates his last film to "the courage of street children". His luminous main character, Sili, manages to make this a sympathetic and optimistic look at the struggle and potential of Africa's most oppressed—young, female, poor, disabled. The movie is accompanied by a score by Mambéty's brother, Wasis Diop. This film was selected as one of the ten best films of 2000 by the Village Voice. Reviewer for The New York Times, A.O. Scott described the film as a "masterpiece of understated humanity."

== Cinematic style and themes ==
The notion of hybridity is a theme that runs through many of Djibril Diop Mambéty films. Like many of his contemporaries, Djibril Diop Mambéty used the cinematic medium to comment on political and social conditions in Africa. As critiques of neocolonialism, like those of Ousmane Sembène and Souleymane Cissé, Mambéty's films can similarly be understood in the context of Third Cinema. Yet, his often unconventional, surrealist, fast-paced, non-linear style distinguishes Mambéty from other prominent filmmakers of Francophone African cinema who employed more traditional didactic, social realist narratives. African Studies scholar Sheila Petty notes, "unlike other African filmmakers of the late 1960s and early 1970s whose films were structured around essentialist nationalist discourse focused on the binary opposition of African values versus cultural alienation, Mambéty sought to expose the diversity of real life". According to critics like Petty, his films were an expression of an African sensibility neither locked into narrow nationalism nor into colonial French culture. Instead of rejecting or elevating one as more or less authentically African, Mambéty confronted and engaged with postindependent Africa's complexities and contradictions. Montage sequences in his films that are overflowing with symbols and sounds of traditional and modern Africa, as well as contemporary European culture, depict hybridity. In addition, his own editing and narrative style are a confluence of the ancient griotic tradition of tribal storytelling and modern avant-garde techniques. Mambéty was interested in transforming conflicting, mixed elements into a usable African culture, and in his words, "reinvent[ing] cinema".

Other common thematic concerns in Mambéty's films are power, wealth and delusion. Offering a cynical view of humanity in his last feature-length film, Hyènes, Mambéty implicates Africans themselves for a continuing dependency on the West. Through the film and in many interviews, the director suggests that Africans are short-sighted in looking to the colonial past for their future, and are misled by their unrestrained desires for material goods that ensure Africa's dependency on foreign aid. Ultimately, however, Mambéty transmitted a message of hopefulness in his final films, which elevate the "little people," as the bearers of a positive and new Africa. "The only truly consistent, unaffected people in the world," Mambéty once said of the marginalized, "for whom every morning brings the same question: how to preserve what is essential to themselves".

Vlad Dima, a professor of French studies, describes Mambéty's alternation "between synchronous and asynchronous sound" in his films as a way for viewers to move from a "visual plane" to an "aural narrative" plane. Dima provides an example of this technique as seen in the opening scene of Contras'city when French classical music accompanies the visual of the French-style Dakar City Hall building; it is then interrupted by the Senegalese flag, a disruption of the music, and a voiceover of someone saying "Dakar."

== Filmography ==
=== Feature films ===
- Badou Boy (1970)
- Touki Bouki (also called The Journey of the Hyena) (1973), International Critic's Prize at Cannes and Special Jury Prize Moscow Film Festival
- Hyènes (1992)
- Le Franc (1994)
- La Petite Vendeuse de Soleil (1999)

=== Short films ===
- Contras'city (1968)
- Parlons Grand-mère (Let's talk Grandmother) (1989)

== Personal life ==
Mambéty was the older brother of musician Wasis Diop and the uncle of actress and director Mati Diop, Wasis Diop's daughter. He was the father of Teemour Diop Mambety.

== See also ==
- African cinema
