= Wasis Diop =

Senegalese musician (born 1950)

- Born: 1950 (age 74–75); Dakar
- Citizenship: Senegal, France
- Occupation(s): Musician, Actor, Film director, Guitarist, Composer

Wasis Diop (born 1950) is a Senegalese musician of international renown, known for blending traditional Senegalese folk music with modern pop and jazz.

== Early life ==
Born in Dakar, Senegal, the son of a Senegalese high official and member of the Lebou ethnic group, Diop left Senegal in the 1970s to study engineering in Paris, but once there turned to music, joining a fellow Senegalese musician, Umbañ U Kset, in forming the band West African Cosmos. Diop left the band in 1979 to start a solo career, and over the next decade achieved some small success, particularly in partnerships with singer Marie-France Anglade of Black heritage, and jazz saxophonist Yasuaki Shimizu. It was not until the early 1990s that his career began to take off, with the success of his first album, the soundtrack to the film Hyenes (which had been directed by his brother, Djibril Diop Mambety). Variety described his soundtrack to 2006's Daratt from Chad as "outstanding".

More albums followed: No Sant in 1995, Toxu in 1998, and the compilation album, Everything Is Never Quite Enough in 2004.

Diop lives in Paris and writes much of his lyrics in French. Among English speaking audiences, he is probably best known for "African Dream", a single from No Sant which narrowly missed the Top 40 in the UK Singles Chart, and "Everything is Never Quite Enough", which is featured on the soundtrack to the 1999 film, The Thomas Crown Affair. "Defal Lu Wor," his Wolof language cover of the Talking Heads song "Once in a Lifetime", was included in a "special markets" CD, World is Africa, produced by Universal Music for Starbucks.

== Personal life ==
His brother was film director Djibril Diop Mambéty. He is the father of French actress and filmmaker Mati Diop.

== Selected discography ==
- Hyènes (1992)
1. "Ramatu the Bird"
2. "Draman"
3. "Mambety Blues"
4. "Kaay Niu Gospel"
5. "Ramatu"
6. "Hyenes"
7. "Yande Sabaar"
8. "The Lord of the Feather"
9. "Dune"
10. "Linguere"
11. "Colobane"
12. "La Rancune"
13. "Demon Tol"
14. "Rendez-Vous"
15. "Ramatu a Capella"
16. "Ballad of the Feather"
- No Sant (1996)
1. "African Dream"
2. "Di Na Wo"
3. "Holaal Bu Baah"
4. "T.G.V."
5. "Ma Na"
6. "Dames Electriques"
7. "N.O.P."
8. "No Sant"
9. "Issa Thiaw"
10. "La Danse des Maures"
11. "Dem Ba Ma"
12. "SB-Le Voyageur"
- Toxu (1998)
1. "Soweto Daal"
2. "My Son"
3. "Everything (...Is Never Quite Enough)"
4. "Que Faut-il Faire?"
5. "Toxu"
6. "Once in a Lifetime"
7. "Accident"
8. "Raï M'Bélé"
9. "After Dreaming"
10. "Julia"
11. "Mori"
12. "Samba Le Berger"
13. "Colobane - Hymne for African Unity"
- Everything Is Never Quite Enough (2003) (compilation)
1. "Le Passeur"
2. "Everything (...Is Never Quite Enough)"
3. "Ramatu"
4. "Samba le Berger"
5. "African Dream"
6. "Dem Ba Ma"
7. "Digge (Le Gong A Sonne)"
8. "Dune"
9. "Soweto Daal"
10. "Défaal Lu Wor (Once in a Lifetime)"
11. "No Sant"
12. "Kaay Niu Gospel"
13. "Julia"
14. "Holaal Bu Baah"
15. "Raï M'Bélé"
16. "Ballad of the Feather"
17. "My Son"
18. "Ma Na"
19. "Les Gueux"
- Judu Bek (2008)
1. "So La La!"
2. "Gudi Diop"
3. "Let It Go"
4. "Kula Soxla"
5. "Anna Mou"
6. "L'Ange Djibril (Hallelujah)"
7. "Ndiago Pop"
8. "Dans L'Aréne"
9. "Judu Bék"
10. "Automobile Mobile"
11. "Galu Nobéél"
12. "Jiné Ji"
13. "Tuti Sop"

The Wasis Diop official's channel in youtube includes some tracks of the album "Sequences" - 2014, and the newest album "De la glace dans la gazelle" - 2021.
