= Christopher Doyle =

Australian cinematographer (born 1952)

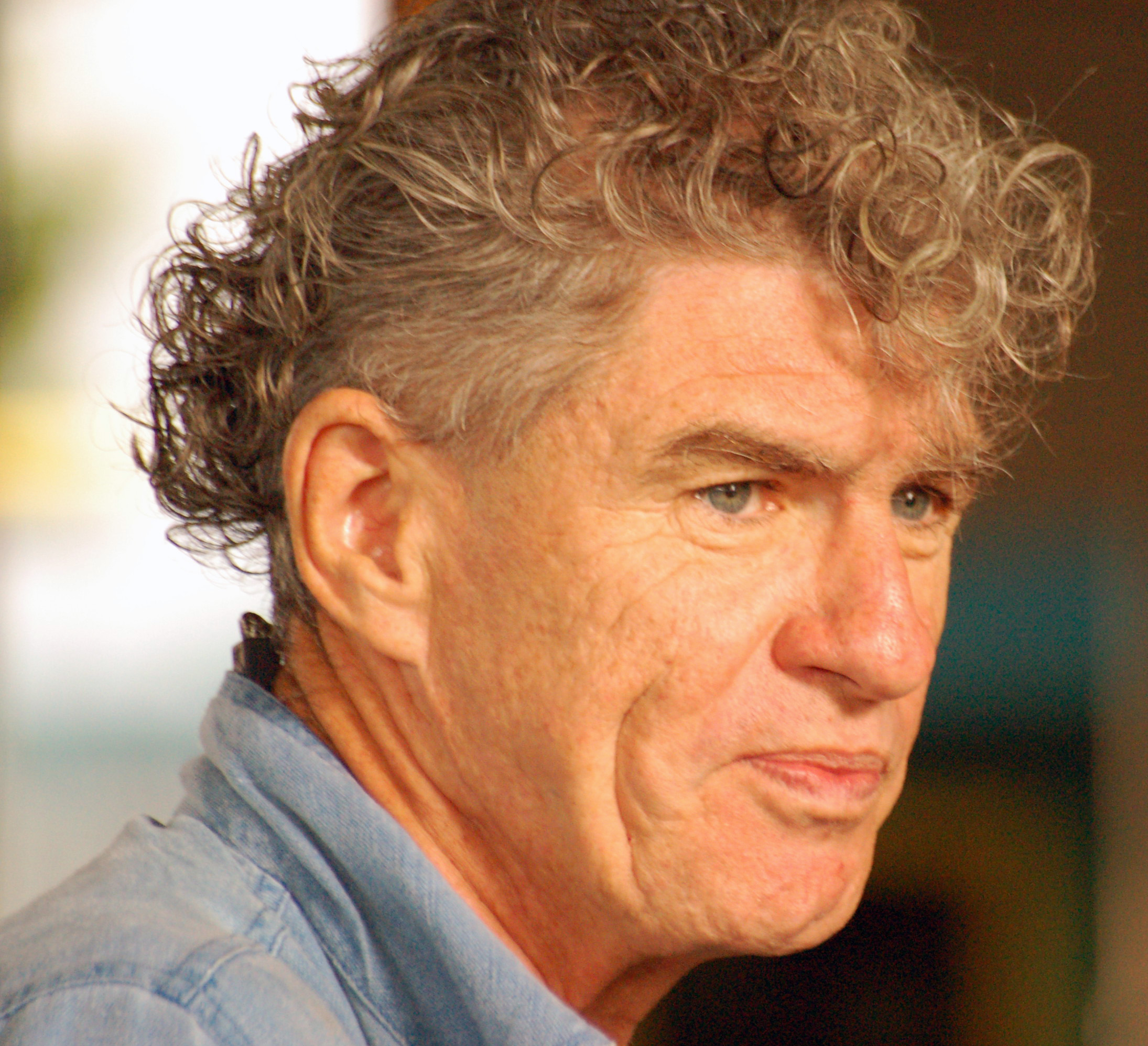
- Doyle in 2005
- Born: 2 May 1952 (age 74); Sydney, New South Wales, Australia
- Occupations: Cinematographer; actor; photographer; film director
- Years active: 1978–present (photographer); 1983–present (cinematographer)

Chinese name
- Traditional Chinese: 杜可風
- Simplified Chinese: 杜可风
Transcriptions
Standard Mandarin
- Hanyu Pinyin: Dù Kěfēng
Yue: Cantonese
- Jyutping: Dou6 Ho2 Fung1

Christopher Doyle (born 2 May 1952), also known as Dou Ho-fung (traditional Chinese: 杜可風; simplified Chinese: 杜可风; pinyin: Dù Kěfēng), is an Australian cinematographer, known for his work in arthouse cinema, mainly Hong Kong films, as well as films directed by Wong Kar-wai.

Doyle has won awards at the Cannes Film Festival and Venice Film Festival, as well as the AFI Award for cinematography, the Golden Horse award (four times), and the Hong Kong Film Award (six times).

== Early life ==
Doyle was born in Sydney, Australia, in 1952. He left his native country on a Norwegian merchant ship at the age of eighteen. Doyle arrived in Taiwan for the first time in the 1970s, while his ship was docked in Keelung Harbor. Doyle met Stan Lai and Ding Nai-chu at Idea House, a restaurant in Taipei.

== Career ==
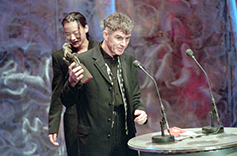
Doyle receiving the Golden Horse Award for Best Cinematography at the 34th Golden Horse Awards in 1997

While living in other countries, he took on several odd jobs, such as being an oil driller in India, a cow herder in Israel, and a doctor of Chinese medicine in Thailand. In the late seventies, Doyle took an interest in Chinese culture and received the Chinese name Dù Kěfēng, which translates to "like the wind". After language studies in Taiwan, he started working as a photographer. A couple of years later, he became a cinematographer, working with Taiwanese director Edward Yang on the 1983 film That Day, on the Beach.

Doyle has worked on over 50 Chinese-language films. He is best known for his collaborations with Wong Kar-wai in Days of Being Wild, Chungking Express, Fallen Angels, Happy Together, In the Mood for Love and 2046. He has collaborated with other Chinese filmmakers on projects including Temptress Moon, Hero, and Dumplings. He has also made more than 20 films in various other languages, working as director of photography on Gus Van Sant's remake of Psycho, Liberty Heights, Last Life in the Universe, Rabbit-Proof Fence, Paranoid Park, and The Limits of Control, among others.

He also wrote, shot, and directed Warsaw Dark, Away with Words starring Asano Tadanobu, and Hong Kong Trilogy: Preschooled Preoccupied Preposterous, an experimental portrait of three generations of Hong Kong people. He co-directed The White Girl with Jenny Suen.

== Filmography ==
=== Cinematographer ===
==== Film ====
Year	Title	Director	Notes
1983	That Day, on the Beach	Edward Yang	With Hui-Kung Chang
1984	A Fu de li wu	Chi-Hua Li; Wei-Ming Lo; Peter Mak	With Hui-Kung Chang and Chi-Ming Leung
1986	Soul	Shu Kei	
1986	Noir et Blanc	Claire Devers	With Daniel Desbois, Alain Lasfargues and Jean-Paul Rosa da Costa
1988	Burning Snow	Patrick Tam	
1989	My Heart Is That Eternal Rose	Patrick Tam	With David Chung
1989	Shuo huang de nu ren	Tony Au	
1990	Days of Being Wild	Wong Kar-wai	
1992	The Peach Blossom Land	Stan Lai	
1992	Mary from Beijing	Sylvia Chang	
1994	Chungking Express	Wong Kar-wai	With Andrew Lau
1994	Ashes of Time	Wong Kar-wai	With Pun-Leung Kwan
1994	Fei xia a da	Stan Lai	
1994	Red Rose White Rose	Stanley Kwan	
1995	The Peony Pavilion	Chen Kuo-fu	
1995	Fallen Angels	Wong Kar-wai	
1996	Tristar	Tsui Hark	With Arthur Wong
1996	Temptress Moon	Chen Kaige	
1996	4 Faces of Eve	Kwok-Leung Gan; Eric Kot; Jan Lamb	
1997	Happy Together	Wong Kar-wai	
1997	Motel Cactus	Ki-Yong Park	
1997	Choh chin luen hau dik yi yan sai gaai	Eric Kot	
1998	Psycho	Gus Van Sant	
1999	Away with Words	Himself	
1999	Liberty Heights	Barry Levinson	
2000	In the Mood for Love	Wong Kar-wai	With Pun-Leung Kwan and Ping Bin Lee
2001	Made	Jon Favreau	
2002	Rabbit-Proof Fence	Phillip Noyce	
2002	The Quiet American	Phillip Noyce	
2002	Hero	Zhang Yimou	
2003	Last Life in the Universe	Pen-ek Ratanaruang	
2003	Green Tea	Zhang Yuan	
2004	2046	Wong Kar-wai	With Pun-Leung Kwan
2004	Dumplings	Fruit Chan	
2005	The White Countess	James Ivory	
2006	Invisible Waves	Pen-ek Ratanaruang	
2006	Lady in the Water	M. Night Shyamalan	
2007	Paranoid Park	Gus Van Sant	With Rain Li
2008	Downloading Nancy	Johan Renck	
2009	The Limits of Control	Jim Jarmusch	
2009	Ondine	Neil Jordan	
2010	Ocean Heaven	Xue Xiao-Lu	
2010	Yong xin tiao	Stanley Kwan	With Rain Li
2010	Passion Play	Mitch Glazer	
2011	Underwater Love - A Pink Musical	Shinji Imaoka	
2011	Love for Life	Gu Changwei	With Changwei Gu and Tao Yang
2011	Tormented	Takashi Shimizu	
2013	Magic Magic	Sebastian Silva	With Glenn Kaplan
2013	American Dreams in China	Peter Chan	
2013	Bends	Flora Lau	
2013	Lanse gotou	Jian Cui	
2014	Ruined Heart! Another Love Story; Between a Criminal and a Whore	Khavn	
2015	Beijing, Niuyue	Rain Li	With Rain Li and Sion Michel
2015	Port of Call	Philip Yung	
2015	Fundamentally Happy	Tan Bee Thiam; Lei Yuan Bin	
2015	Enishi: The Bride of Izumo	Hiroshi Horiuchi	
2016	Endless Poetry	Alejandro Jodorowsky	
2016	Stockholm, My Love	Mark Cousins	With Mark Cousins
2017	You Mean The World To Me	Saw Teong Hin	
2017	The White Girl	Himself; Jenny Suen	With Kubbie Tsoi
2018	Love Only	Charine Chan	
2019	They Say Nothing Stays the Same	Joe Odagiri	
2019	Tezuka's Barbara	Makoto Tezuka	With Kubbie Tsoi
2020	Love After Love	Ann Hui	
2021	Gei wo 1 tian	Erica Li	With Kubbie Tsoi
2025	Morte Cucina	Pen-ek Ratanaruang	

==== Short film ====
Year	Title	Director	Notes
1996	wkw/tk/1996@7′55″hk.net	Wong Kar-wai	
1998	Motorola	Wong Kar-wai	
2002	Goin Home	Peter Chan	Segment of Three
2004	The Hand	Wong Kar-wai	Segment of Eros
2004	Dumplings	Fruit Chan	Segment of Three... Extremes
2006	The Madness of the Dance	Carol Morley	With Rain Li
2007	Meeting Helen	Emily Woof	With Rain Li
2012	Linda Linda	Tsien-Tsien Zhang	

==== Television ====
Year	Title	Director	Notes
2018	Anthony Bourdain: Parts Unknown	Asia Argento	Episode "Hong Kong"; With Frederic Menou
2020	Ouverture of Something that Never Ended	Alessandro Michele; Gus Van Sant	7 episodes

==== Documentary works ====
Film

Year	Title	Director
2015	I Am Belfast	Mark Cousins
2015	Hong Kong Trilogy: Preschooled Preoccupied Preposterous	Himself
2017	Human Flow	Ai Weiwei
2019	The Rest	Ai Weiwei

Television

Year	Title	Director	Notes
1996	Century of Cinema	Stanley Kwan	Segment Yang ± Yin: Gender in Chinese Cinema

=== Director ===
Year	Title	Director	Writer	Notes
1998	Typhoon Shelter	Yes	—N/a	TV movie, co-directed with Shuji Tsukamoto
1999	Away with Words	Yes	Yes	
2006	Paris, je t'aime	Yes	Yes	Segment "Porte de Choisy"
2008	Izolator aka "Warsaw Dark"	Yes	No	
2014	Beautiful 2014	Yes	No	Segment "HK 2014 - Education for All"
2015	Hong Kong Trilogy: Preschooled Preoccupied Preposterous	Yes	No	Documentary film
2017	The White Girl	Yes	Yes	Co-directed with Jenny Suen
2018	Love Only	Yes	No	Creative and visual director

== Awards and nominations ==
Year	Title	Award/Nomination
1994	Ashes of Time	Osella d'Oro for Best Cinematography
2000	In the Mood for Love	Grand Technical Prize at the Cannes Film Festival; New York Film Critics Circle Award for Best Cinematographer; National Society of Film Critics Award for Best Cinematography; Nominated- Chicago Film Critics Association Award for Best Cinematography
2002	Hero	New York Film Critics Circle Award for Best Cinematographer; Chicago Film Critics Association Award for Best Cinematography; Nominated- National Society of Film Critics Award for Best Cinematography
2004	2046	New York Film Critics Circle Award for Best Cinematographer; National Society of Film Critics Award for Best Cinematography

On 26 May 2017, Doyle was honoured during the 70th Cannes Festival with the “Pierre Angénieux ExcelLens in Cinematography" award, in tribute to his successful and influential career.

== Bibliography ==
- Angel Talk (1996) – Behind the scenes photo book covering Fallen Angels – ISBN 978-4-7952-8069-4
- Backlit by the Moon (1996) – Japanese photography monograph – ISBN 978-4-947648-39-6
- Photographs of Tamaki Ogawa (1996) – Japanese photography monograph – ISBN 978-4-947599-45-2
- Doyle on Doyle (1997) – Japanese photography monograph – ISBN 4-9900557-1-3
- Buenos Aires (1997) – Behind the scenes photo book covering Happy Together – ISBN 978-4-7952-8066-3
- Don't Cry for Me, Argentina (1997) – Photographic journal account of filming Happy Together – ISBN 962-8114-24-7
- A Cloud in Trousers (1998) – Gallery exhibition monograph – ISBN 978-1-889195-33-9
- There Is a Crack in Everything (2003) – Photography monograph
- R34g38b25 (2004) – Behind the scenes photo book covering Hero – ISBN 978-962-86177-0-8
- Talking White - Behind-the-scenes photobook covering The White Girl (co-written with Jenny Suen)

== See also ==
- Cinema of Hong Kong
