= A Story of Children and Film =

- Directed by: Mark Cousins
- Screenplay by: Mark Cousins
- Produced by: Mary Bell; Adam Dawtrey
- Release date: 2013
- Running time: 101 minutes
- Language: English

A Story of Children and Film is a 2013 documentary film directed by Mark Cousins. It features clips from movies from around the world that feature children, and scenes featuring the director's niece and nephew.

== Films referenced ==
- The 400 Blows (1959), directed by François Truffaut
- Alyonka (1961), directed by Boris Barnet
- An Angel at My Table (1991), directed by Jane Campion
- Big Business (1929), with Laurel and Hardy, directed by James W. Horne and Leo McCarey
- The Bill Douglas Trilogy: My Childhood (1972), directed by Bill Douglas
- The Boot (1993), directed by Mohammad-Ali Talebi
- Children in the Wind (1937), directed by Hiroshi Shimizu
- Crows (1994), directed by Dorota Kędzierzawska
- Curly Top (1935), with Shirley Temple, directed by Irving Cummings
- Emil and the Detectives (1931), directed by Gerhard Lamprecht
- E.T. the Extra-Terrestrial (1982), directed by Steven Spielberg
- Fanny and Alexander (1982), directed by Ingmar Bergman
- Finlandia (1922), directed by Erkki Karu
- Forbidden Games (1952), directed by René Clément
- Frankenstein (1931), directed by James Whale
- Freedom Is Paradise (1989), directed by Sergey Bodrov
- Gasman (1998), directed by Lynne Ramsay
- Ghatashraddha (1977), directed by Girish Kasaravalli
- Great Expectations (1946), directed by David Lean
- A Hometown in Heart (1949), directed by Yoon Yong-gyu
- Hugo and Josephine (1967), directed by Kjell Grede
- I Wish (2011), directed by Hirokazu Koreeda
- An Inn in Tokyo (1935), directed by Yasujirō Ozu
- Kauwboy (2012), directed by Boudewijn Koole
- Kes (1969), directed by Ken Loach
- The Kid (1921), directed by Charlie Chaplin
- The Little Girl Who Sold the Sun (1999), directed by Djibril Diop Mambéty
- Long Live the Republic! (1965), directed by Karel Kachyňa
- Meet Me in St. Louis (1944), directed by Vincente Minnelli
- Melody for a Street Organ (2009), directed by Kira Muratova
- Mirror (1975), directed by Andrei Tarkovsky
- A Mouse in the House (1947), with Tom and Jerry, directed by William Hanna and Joseph Barbera
- Moonrise Kingdom (2012), directed by Wes Anderson
- Moving (1993), directed by Shinji Sōmai
- The Newest City in the World (1974), directed by Xhanfise Keko
- The Night of the Hunter (1955), directed by Charles Laughton
- Nobody Knows (2004), directed by Hirokazu Koreeda
- Los Olvidados (1950), directed by Luis Buñuel
- Palle Alone in the World (1949), directed by Astrid Henning-Jensen
- The Red Balloon (1953), directed by Albert Lamorisse
- The Spirit of the Beehive (1973), directed by Víctor Erice
- The Steamroller and the Violin (1961), directed by Andrei Tarkovsky
- Ten Minutes Older (1978), directed by Herz Frank
- Tomka and His Friends (1977), directed by Xhanfise Keko
- Two Solutions for One Problem (1975), directed by Abbas Kiarostami
- The Unseen (1996), directed by Miroslav Janek
- The White Balloon (1995), directed by Jafar Panahi
- Willow and Wind (1999), directed by Mohammad-Ali Talebi
- Yaaba (1989), directed by Idrissa Ouedraogo
- The Yellow Balloon (1953), directed by J. Lee Thompson
- Yellow Earth (1984), directed by Chen Kaige
- Zero for Conduct (1933), directed by Jean Vigo
