= Stockholm, My Love =

- Directed by: Mark Cousins
- Written by: Mark Cousins; Anita Oxburgh
- Produced by: Mary Bell; Adam Dawtrey; Anita Oxburgh
- Starring: Neneh Cherry
- Cinematography: Christopher Doyle
- Edited by: Timo Langer
- Production companies: BBC Films; Creative Scotland; Film Capital Stockholm; Filmregion Stockholm Mälardalen; Svenska Filminstitutet; Sveriges Television
- Release date: 16 November 2016 (Sweden)
- Running time: 88 minutes
- Countries: United Kingdom; Sweden
- Languages: English; Swedish
- Box office: $16,241

Stockholm, My Love is a 2016 drama film and musical film starring Neneh Cherry. Set in Stockholm, it features music by the likes of Benny Andersson from ABBA.
