= Cinema Is Everywhere =

Cinema is Everywhere
- Directed by: Teal Greyhavens
- Written by: Teal Greyhavens
- Produced by: Jason Gordon
- Starring: Javed Akhtar; Shyam Benegal; Nouri Bouzid; Fruit Chan; Mark Cousins; Stanley Kwan; Sudhir Mishra; Tilda Swinton
- Cinematography: Teal Greyhavens
- Music by: Brandon K. Verrett
- Production company: Spiral Pictures
- Distributed by: TriCoast Worldwide
- Release date: October 22, 2011 (Austin Film Festival)
- Running time: 86 minutes
- Country: United States
- Languages: English; Mandarin Chinese

Cinema is Everywhere is a 2011 documentary film by writer, director and cinematographer Teal Greyhavens that weaves together three stories from India, Scotland and Tunisia, each featuring personal perspectives on the effects of local, regional and international cinema on people's lives. It is based around the idea that cinema is a universal visual language that people of almost any culture can enjoy and even create regardless of where they are, who they know or how much money they have. It has been called "the global story of cinema and how it affects our everyday lives." The documentary was filmed by Greyhavens in 2009 while he traveled on a Thomas J. Watson Fellowship.

== Synopsis ==
The film follows real-time stories of actors, directors and cinema viewers in four different countries. In Tunisia, a documentary film director struggles to have his frank film about human sexuality be seen in their conservative culture. In India, a young actress struggles with the challenges of making a name for herself while dealing with racist barriers. And in Scotland, actress Tilda Swinton and filmmaker Mark Cousins create a film festival that travels to audiences rather than having the audiences come to the festival. These stories jump back and forth as the narratives develop, interspersed with scenes from video stores, projection booths and homes of all kinds. Toward the end of film there are brief commentaries by Indian film director Sudhir Mishra and Chinese director Fruit Chan.

== Reception ==
The film premiered at the Austin Film Festival on October 22, 2011, and received an enthusiastic reception. One reviewer called it "a love letter to the joy, beauty, pain and importance of a tool and art form that in 24 frames per second can express our deepest hopes and fears and connect us all." It was screened a month later at the Costa Rica International Film Festival. In January 2012, it was seen at the Jaipur International Film Festival in Jaipur, India.
