= Mark Cousins (filmmaker) =

Northern Irish film director

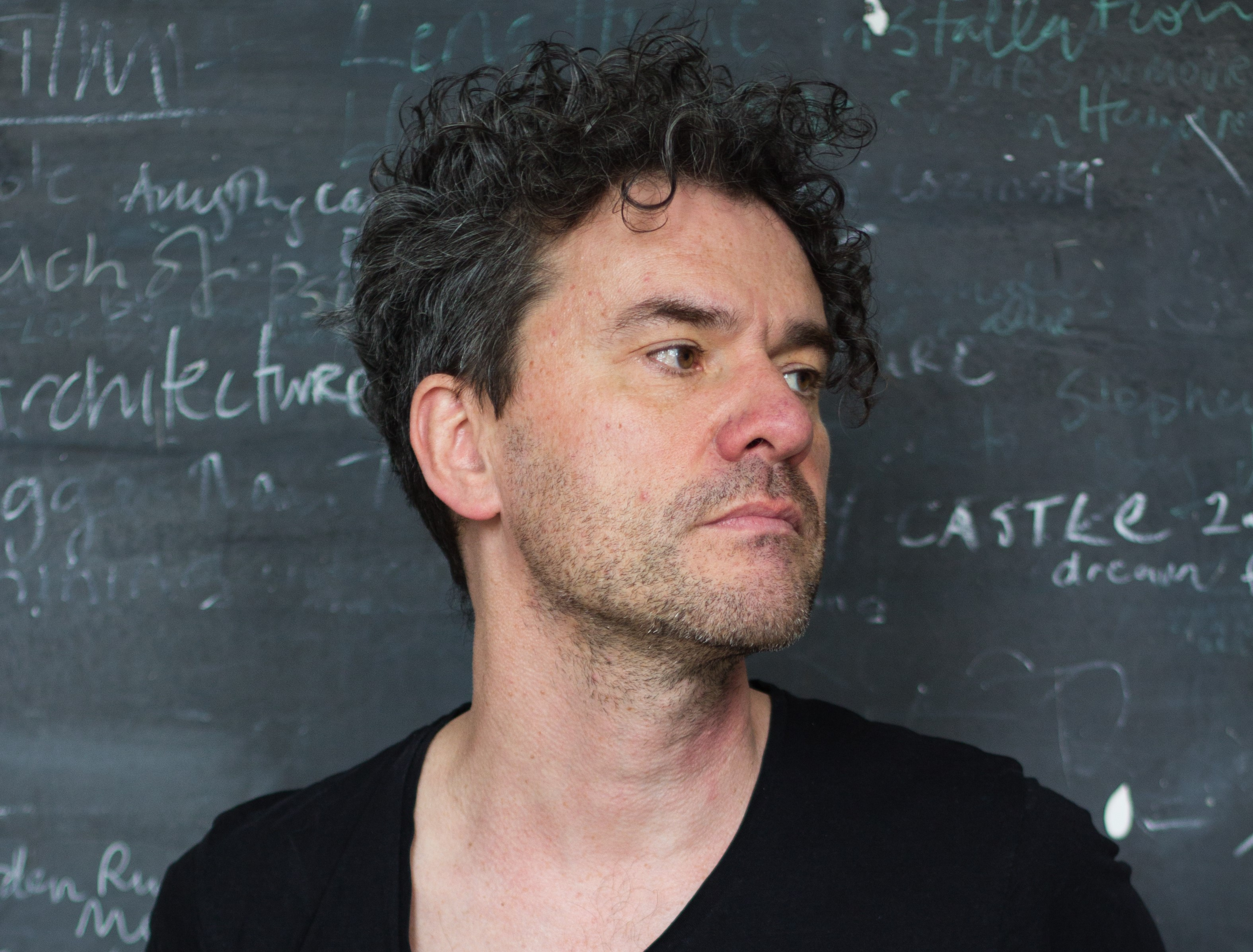
- Cousins in 2016
- Born: 3 May 1965 (age 61); Coventry, England
- Occupations: Film director, screenwriter, producer, author
- Years active: 1988–present
- Notable work: The Story of Film: An Odyssey
- Mark Cousins introducing himself recorded February 2017

Mark Nathaniel Cousins (born 3 May 1965) is a Northern Irish director and writer. A prolific documentarian, among his best-known works is the 15-hour 2011 documentary The Story of Film: An Odyssey.

== Early life and education ==
Born in Coventry, England, Cousins was raised in Northern Ireland, moving with his family from Belfast to Ardglass and then to Antrim, while attending St Louis Grammar School in nearby Ballymena. This background is still reflected in his distinctive, lilting Northern Irish accent, which he has said people often recognize before they recognize his face. The twin son of a mixed Catholic–Protestant marriage, he has described his upbringing as marked by class awareness and the tensions of The Troubles, recalling having to stay overnight at school during the 1974 Ulster Workers' Council strike “in case those bad people got us.”

Cousins has reflected that the timidity he connected with his Northern Irish, working-class upbringing made it hard to consider calling himself a creative person, but that he eventually shed that constraint and grew much freer in claiming a creative identity. At the same time, he has also spoken about how traces of class awareness have stayed with him, describing how certain spaces can still feel marked by middle-class norms. His class position and being “a skinny little arty-brainy boy” marked him as a target for bullies, a common experience in the hierarchical environment of the time. The bullying stopped when he was 16, after one of the most popular boys in school told others to leave him alone.

Cousins has said that he had stopped believing in God by the time he did his A-levels in 1983. His art teacher, Heather McKelvey, introduced him to modernism and creative expression in a way that offered him “something else to believe in,” opening “a little door in my head which has never closed” and giving him the confidence to see creativity as a lifelong pursuit. He later moved to Scotland to study, escaping the cultural and political limitations of Northern Ireland at the time, and graduated from the University of Stirling in film and the visual arts in the mid-1980s.

== Career ==
Cousins interviewed famous filmmakers such as David Lynch, Martin Scorsese and Roman Polanski in the TV series Scene by Scene. He presented the BBC cult film series Moviedrome from June 1997 to July 2000. He introduced 66 films for the show, including the little-seen Nicolas Roeg film Eureka.

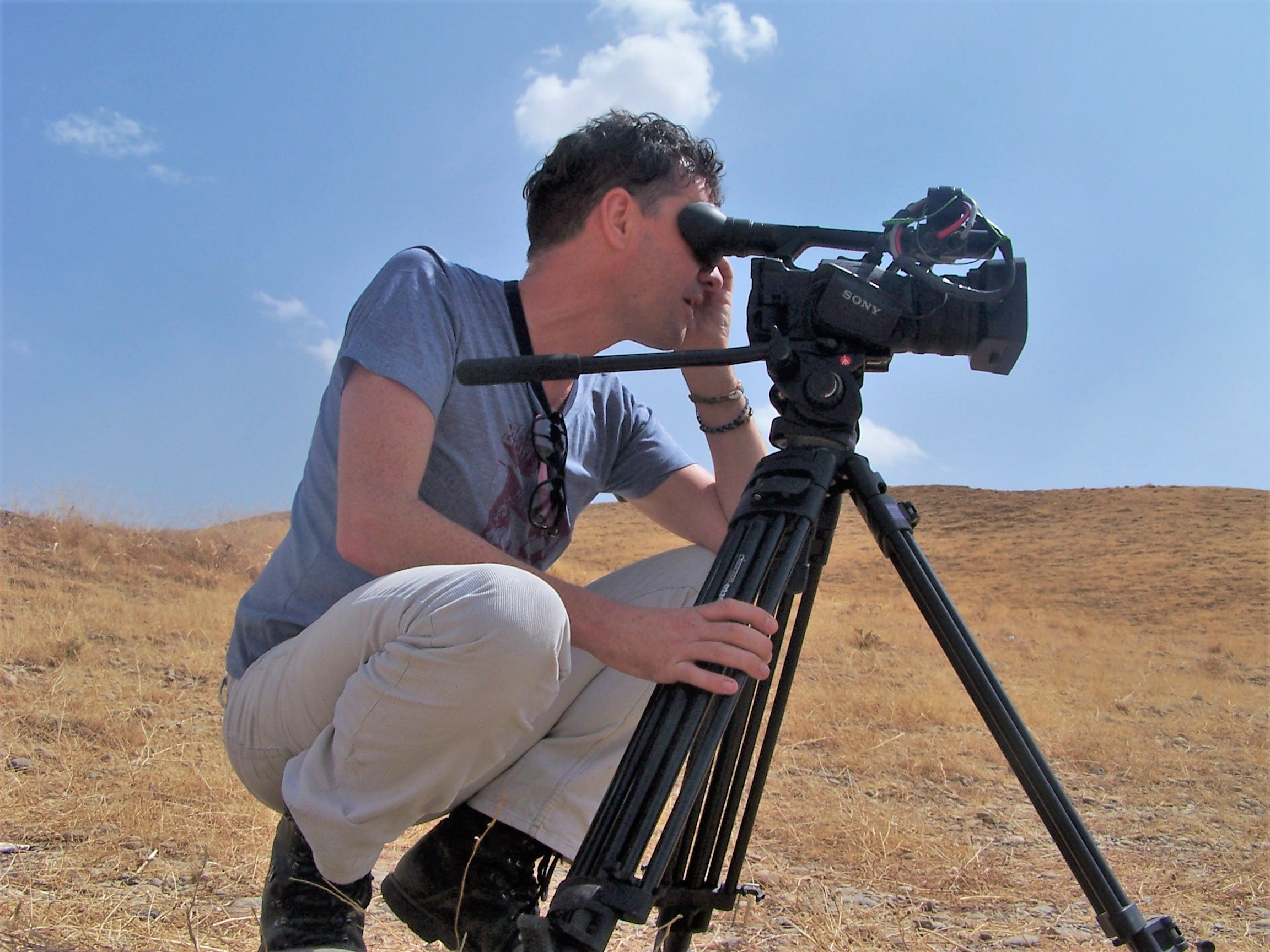
Cousins filming in Kurdisch Iraq, 2003

In the 1990s and 2000s, Cousins interviewed directors, producers, and actors including Steven Spielberg, Woody Allen, Tom Hanks, Sean Connery, Brian De Palma, Steve Martin, Lauren Bacall, Jane Russell, Paul Schrader, Bernardo Bertolucci, Kirk Douglas, Jeanne Moreau, Terence Stamp, Jack Lemmon, Janet Leigh and Rod Steiger.

In 2009, Cousins and Tilda Swinton co-founded the "8 1/2 Foundation". Together they also created a project where they mounted a 33.5-tonne portable cinema on a large truck which was physically pulled through the Scottish Highlands. The travelling independent film festival was featured prominently in a documentary called Cinema is Everywhere. The festival was repeated in 2011.

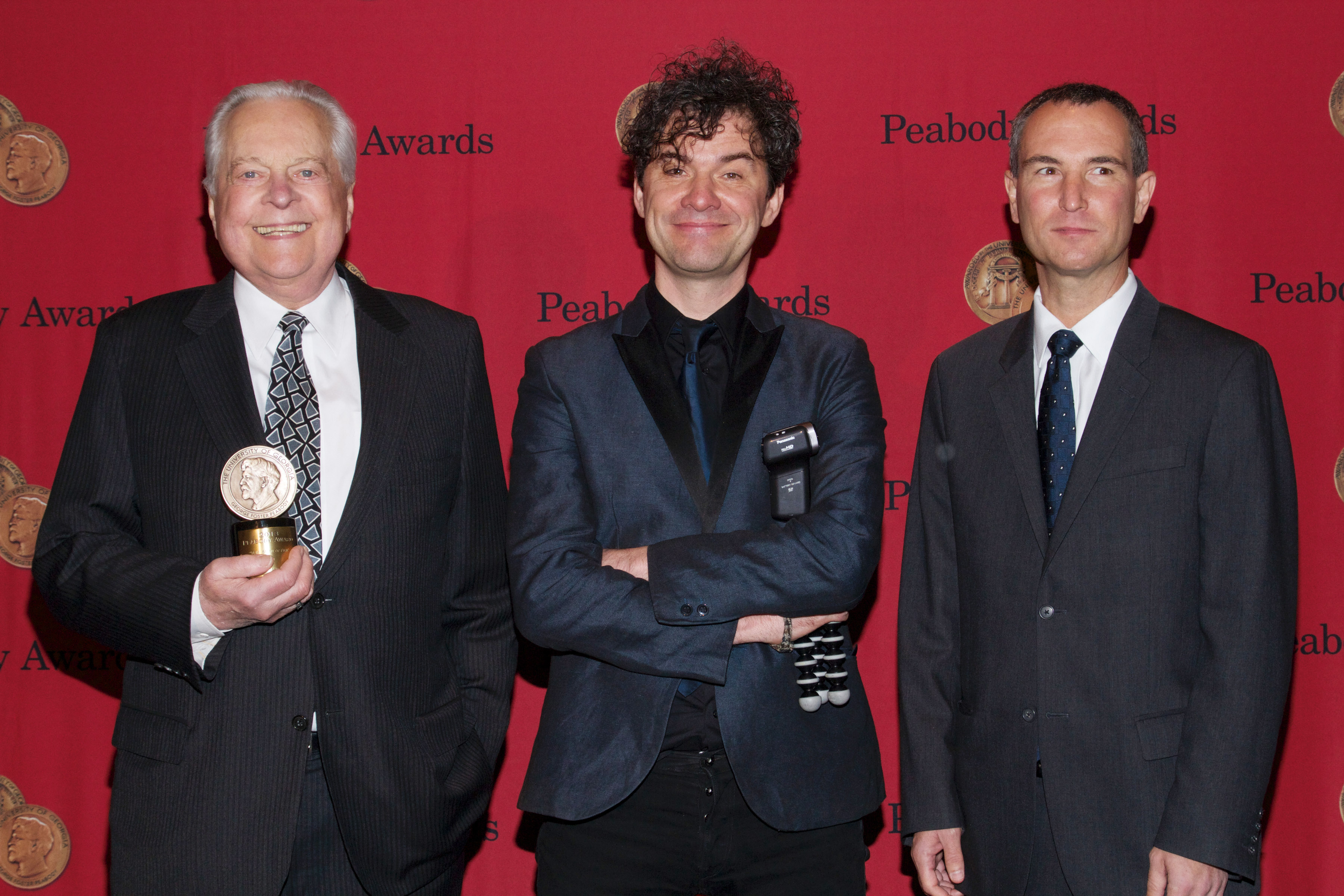
Robert Osborne, Cousins and TCM senior vice president Charles Tabesh in 2014, with the Peabody Award that TCM received for its presentation of The Story of Film: An Odyssey

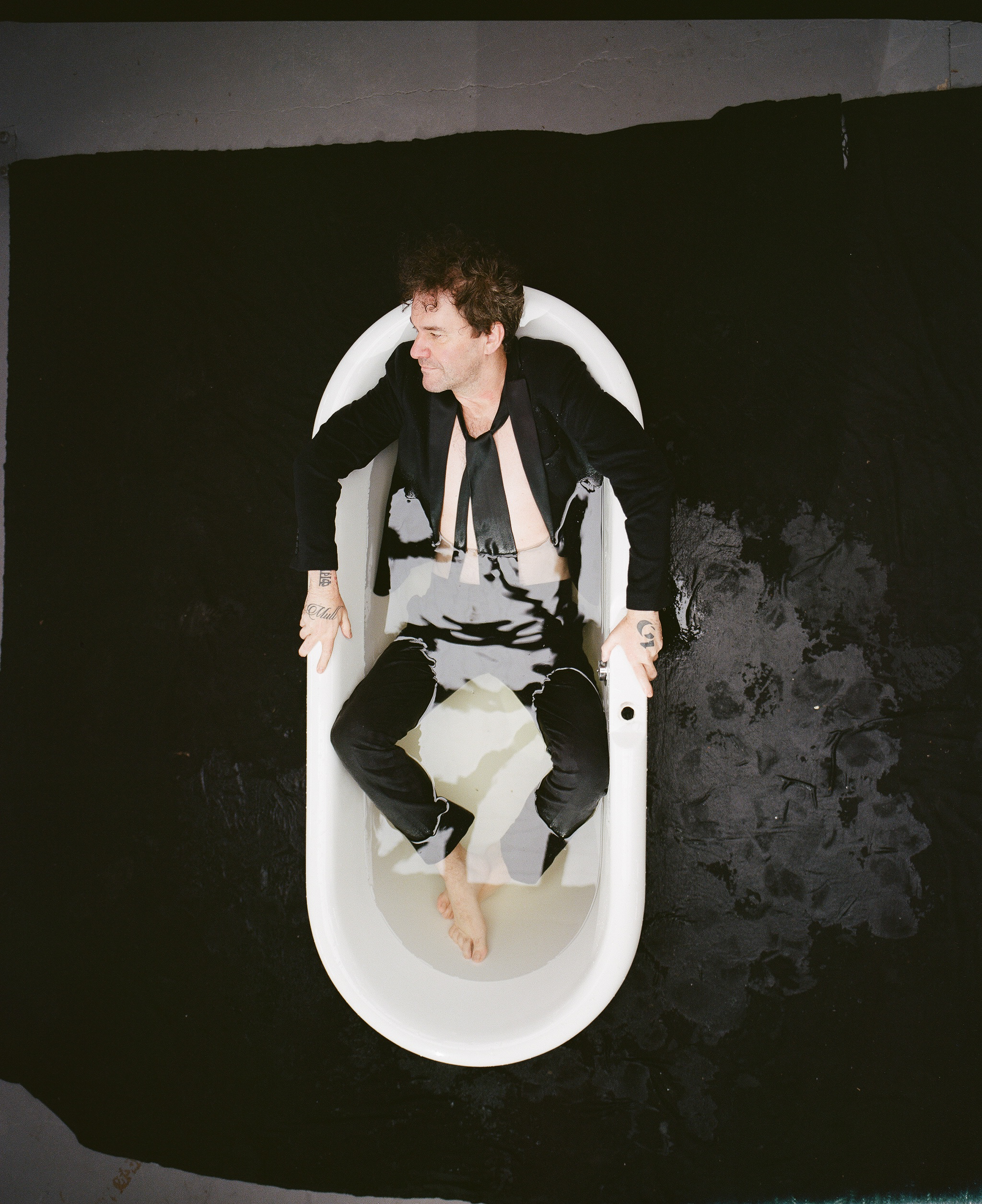
Cousins as photographed by Tom Webster

Cousins's 2011 film The Story of Film: An Odyssey was broadcast on Channel 4 as 15 one-hour television episodes on More4, and later, featured at the 2011 Toronto International Film Festival. In September 2013, it began to be shown on Turner Classic Movies (TCM). Drawing on its exhaustive film library, TCM complemented each episode with relevant short films and feature films ranging from the familiar to the rarely seen. TCM received a 2013 Peabody Award "for its inclusive, uniquely annotated survey of world cinema history".

What Is This Film Called Love?, an experimental self-shot travel diary in which Cousins spends three days exploring Mexico City, was a spontaneous project that grew out of exhaustion after completing The Story of Film. It was shot on a £100 camera he got from his long-time partner Gill and its entire budget of £5.8 was spent on laminating the photograph of Sergei Eisenstein, which he addresses throughout the film. Cousins considers it something entirely opposite to his previous work. Guy Lodge in Variety dismissed it as a "whimsical travel diary" and a "fatuous vanity project", while Jessica Kiang in The Playlist described watching it as a deeply personal experience that she found unexpectedly affecting, though acknowledging it is "undoubtedly not for everyone" and could strike others as "pretentious" or "amateurish."

A similar production approach was made in Here Be Dragons, which begins as a short trip to Albania to attend the 13th Tirana International Film Festival but pivots to focus on the deteriorating state of the Albanian film archive and the urgency of its preservation. In it Cousins repurposes footage from the archive and intercuts it with that of his own wanderings to highlight the country's cinematic heritage. Produced on a microbudget of £10,000, it was shot and edited over the course of nine days. Stephen Dalton of The Hollywood Reporter described it as "a fascinating subject squandered with too much directorial self-indulgence", while Time Out called it "another thoughtful meditation on our emotional and political relationship to the screen". Charel Muller of Cineuropa noted that whether viewers enjoy it "depends very much on your personal opinion of Cousins."

6 Desires: DH Lawrence and Sardinia follows Cousins on a road trip through the island inspired by the writer's 1921 visit, continuing his series of travel-based essay films that mix personal reflection with observations on place and history. In Life May Be Cousins turns his usual solo style into a dialogue by structuring it as a series of video letters exchanged between him and Iranian director and actor Mania Akbari. The correspondence contrasts Cousins' travel-based reflections on art and politics with Akbari's accounts of exile and illness, which The Guardian's Andrew Pulver judged "intriguing", noting that its "intensely felt passion" also carried "a sense of self-advertisement."

A Story of Children and Film received positive reviews from multiple critics, with Peter Bradshaw in The Guardian calling it "entirely distinctive, sometimes eccentric, always brilliant".

Cousins subsequently wrote and directed I Am Belfast, in which the city is personified by a 10,000-year-old woman. Portions of the film in progress, with a score by Belfast composer David Holmes were screened at the 2014 Belfast Film Festival.

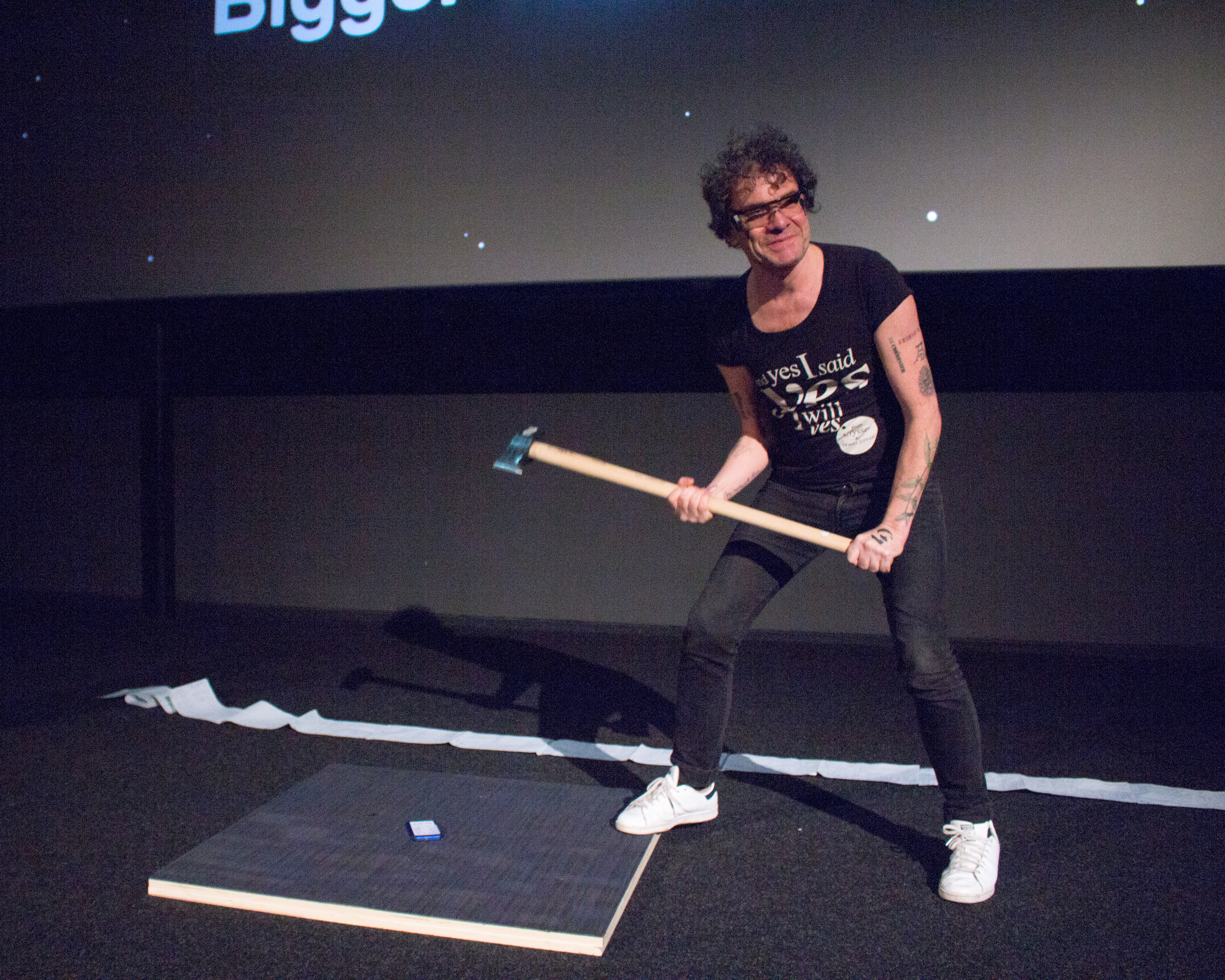
Cousins preparing to destroy the hard-drive with Bigger Than The Shining at the IFFR 2017

Cousins took an axe to his own film Bigger Than The Shining after screening to a live audience at the 2017 International Film Festival Rotterdam (IFFR), with the intention of never screening it again; he said private viewing links still existed but urged their holders to delete them.

Cousins is the co-artistic director of Cinema China, The Ballerina Ballroom Cinema of Dreams, and A Pilgrimage, with Tilda Swinton. Together with Antonia Bird, Robert Carlyle, and Irvine Welsh, Cousins is a director of the production company 4Way Pictures. Between 2001 and 2011, he wrote for Prospect, and now writes for Sight & Sound and Filmkrant.

Cousins was appointed honorary professor of the University of Glasgow in 2013, as well as being awarded honorary doctorates at both the University of Edinburgh in 2007 and University of Stirling in 2014.

Cousins is a patron of the Edinburgh International Film Festival, and previously acted as both a programmer and director (1996–1997) of the festival.

Cousins chairs the Belfast Film Festival, and is a board member of Michael Moore's Traverse City Film Festival. He was a member of the Audentia Award jury at the 42nd Göteborg International Film Festival (GIFF) in 2019, as well as member of the Official Competition jury at the 53rd Karlovy Vary International Film Festival in 2018.

In 2019, Cousins was elected a Fellow of the Royal Society of Edinburgh.

In 2021, he was on the jury for that year's BFI London Film Festival.

His film The Story of Film: A New Generation was first screened at the Cannes Film Festival in 2021.

== Personal life ==
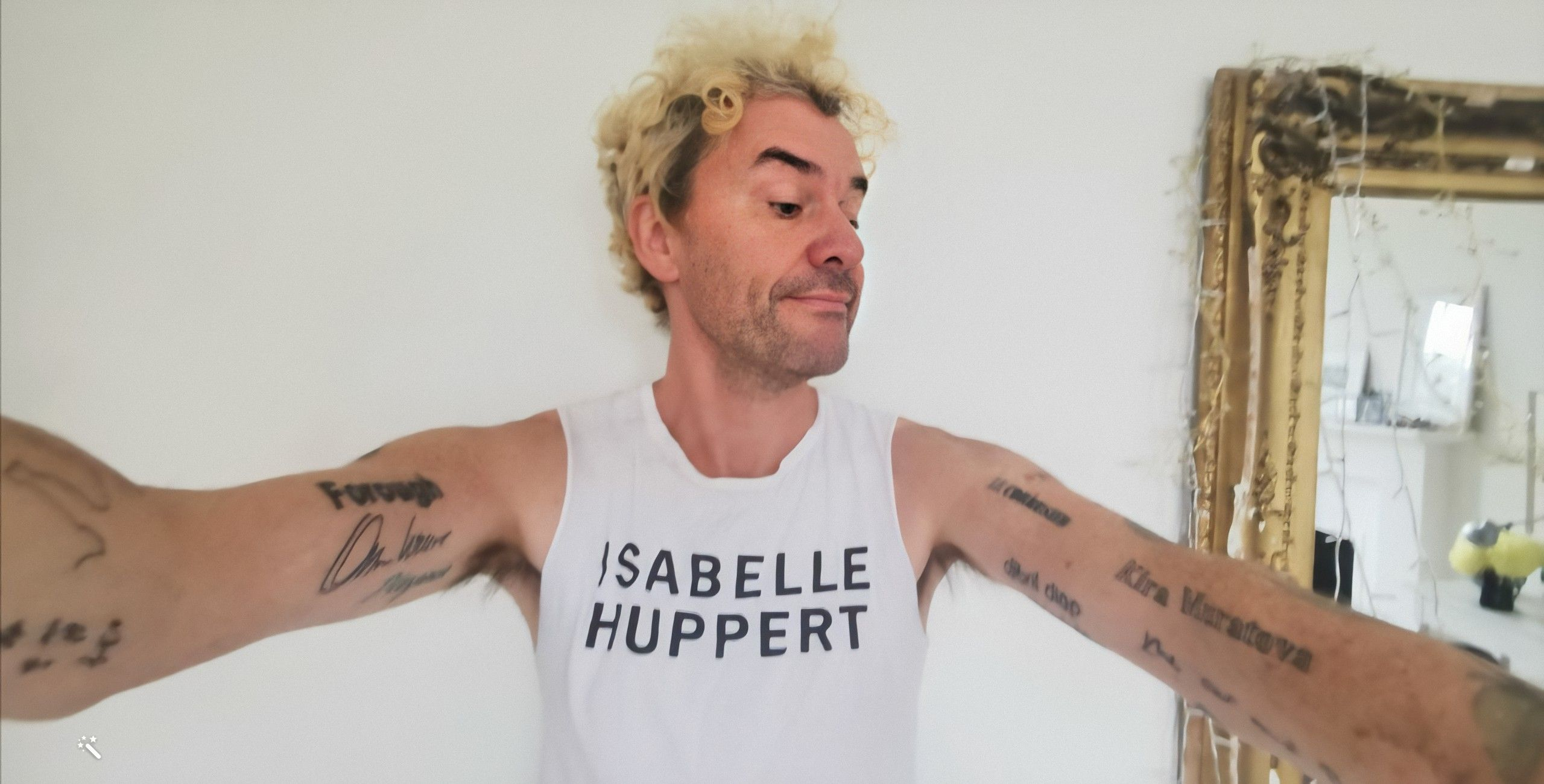
Cousins in a self-portrait showing his tattoos

Cousins has been in a long-term relationship with psychotherapist Gill Moreton, whom he met at the University of Stirling in 1984; they live in Edinburgh.

He has spoken about the importance of the body in both life and art, describing it as “the thing that makes us part of the world.” He has several tattoos on his arms bearing the names of filmmakers and other figures he admires, which he says serve as a form of embodied memory – “they left a permanent mark.”

In December 2023 Cousins was one of 50 filmmakers who signed an open letter to Libération demanding a ceasefire and an end to the killing of civilians amid the 2023 Israeli invasion of the Gaza Strip, and for a humanitarian corridor into Gaza to be established for humanitarian aid, and the release of hostages.

== Filmography ==
Year	Title	Role	Format	Runtime	Notes
1989	Dear Mr Gorbachev	Associate director	TV	60m	Directed with Michael Grigsby, ITV
1990	Gulf War: Scottish Eye	Director	TV	38 mins	
1993	Another Journey by Train	Co-director and producer	TV	59 mins	Co-directed by Mark Forrest
1994	I Know Where I'm Going! Revisited	Director	TV	40 mins	
1996	Ian Hamilton Finlay: In a Wee Way	Director	TV	38 mins	Co-directed by Mark Forrest
1996	I Remember IKWIG	Director	TV	40m	
1997–2001	Scene by Scene	Director and presenter	TV	24 Episodes x 60 mins	Interviews include Martin Scorsese, Brian De Palma, David Lynch, Jane Russell, Paul Schrader, Bernardo Bertolucci, and Roman Polanski. Shown on BBC.
1997–2000	Moviedrome	Presenter	TV	66 Episodes x 5 mins	Shown on BBC.
2005	Cinema Iran	Director and narrator	TV	59 mins	Shown on Channel 4. Presented by Omid Djalili
2005	On the Road with Kiarostami	Writer and director	TV	28 mins	
2005	Faith	Executive Producer	TV movie	102 mins	Starring Maxine Peake, Clive Russell and Jason Flemyng.
2008	First Impressions	Writer and director	Short Film	15 mins	Shot in Northern Iraq.
2008	The New Ten Commandments: Kenny Richie	Co-director	Film	Anthology Film	Co-directed with Irvine Welsh. Shown on BBC Two
2008	The New Ten Commandments: 8 1/2	Co-director	Film	Anthology Film	Co-directed with Tilda Swinton. Shown on BBC Two
2008	The New Ten Commandments	Contributing Director	Film	101 mins	Co-directed of two of the ten Chapters. Shown on BBC Two
2009	The First Movie	Writer and director	Film	81 mins	BAFTA Scotland Award Nominee for ‘Best Single Documentary’, Royal Television Society Award Nominee for ‘Best Arts Documentary’.
2011	The Story of Film: An Odyssey	Writer, director and narrator	Film	930 mins	Shown on More4 and Turner Classic Movies.
2011	60 Seconds of Solitude in Year Zero	Contributing director	Anthology Film	60 mins	
2011	Cinema Is Everywhere	Self	Film	86 mins	Centred on a project between Cousins and Tilda Swinton.
2012	What Is this Film Called Love?	Writer, director and narrator	Film	75 mins	A personal film about Mexico City and Sergei Eisenstein
2013	Dear Georges Méliès	Writer and co-director	Short Film	8 ½ mins	Co-directed with 102 children and Tilda Swinton.
2013	Apollo: Prvo ratno kino	Co-writer	Short Film	14 mins	
2013	Here Be Dragons	Writer and director	Film	76 mins	Centred on Albanian cinema
2013	A Story of Children and Film	Writer, director and narrator	Film	101 mins	
2014	Homeless	Writer and director	Short Film	10 mins	
2014	The Wind in the Trees	Writer and director	Short Film	10 mins	
2014	The Place	Writer and director	Short Film	38 mins	
2014	The Big Shave Backwards	Writer and director	Short Film	1 min	
2014	Life May Be	Co-writer and co-director	Film	80 mins	Cine-letters between Mark Cousins and Mania Akbari
2014	The Oar and the Winnowing Fan	Writer and director	Short Film	4 Episodes x Various mins	
2014	But Then Again, Too Few to Mention	Writer and director	Short Film	7 mins	
2014	The Film That Buys the Cinema	Contributing Writer and director	Film	77 mins	Alongside Nicolas Roeg, Tony Grisoni, Jennifer Abbott and Peter Strickland.
2014	6 Desires: D. H. Lawrence and Sardinia	Writer, director and narrator	Film	83 mins	
2014	The Place	Writer and director	Short Film	38 mins	
2014	Dear John Grierson	Writer and director	Short Film	30 mins	
2015	Your Eyes Flash Solemnly with Hate	Writer and director	Short Film	10 mins	About the killer of Pier Paolo Pasolini
2015	I Am Belfast	Writer, director and narrator	Film	86 mins	Cinematography by Christopher Doyle
2015	Atomic, Living in Dread and Promise	Writer and director	Film	72 mins	Score by Mogwai. Produced by BBC and the British Film Institute.
2016	Antonia Bird: From EastEnders to Hollywood	Executive producer and self	Film	90 mins	About Cousin's late friend Antonia Bird
2016	Stockholm, My Love	Co-writer and director	Film	88 mins	Cinematography by Christopher Doyle, starring Neneh Cherry and co-written by Anita Oxburgh
2016	Bigger Than The Shining	Director	Film	83 mins	Cousins axed the film's DCP after a screening at the 2017 International Film Festival Rotterdam (IFFR), intending it to never be shown again.
2016	Eisenstein on Lawrence	Writer and director	Short Film	9 mins	Sergei Eisenstein talks about D. H. Lawrence
2017	Storm in My Heart	Director	Film	100 mins	Experimental film about Susan Hayward and Lena Horne.
2017	The Eyes of Orson Welles	Writer, director and narrator	Film	110 mins	Consulted on and featuring Beatrice Welles, Executive Produced by Michael Moore.
2019	Women Make Film: A New Road Movie Through Cinema	Writer, director and narrator	Film	840 mins	Starring Thandiwe Newton, Jane Fonda, Tilda Swinton, Sharmila Tagore, Adjoa Andoh and Debra Winger.
2020	Alexander's Film	Writer and director	Short Film	8 mins	
2020	40 Days to Learn Film	Writer, director and narrator	Film	136 mins	
2020	This Violation	Director	Short Film	8 mins	
2020	Dear Paul Schrader	Writer and director	Short Film	11 mins	
2021	The Storms of Jeremy Thomas	Writer and director	Film	90 mins	A road movie with the film producer Jeremy Thomas.
2021	The Story of Looking	Writer, director and narrator	Film	84 mins	Based loosely on the book by Cousins of the same name.
2021	The Story of Film: A New Generation	Writer, director and narrator	Film	160 mins	A sequel to The Story of Film: An Odyssey.
2021	The Flowers the Fish and the Cockerel	Self / film subject	Film	83 mins	A documentary about Mark Cousins.
2022	March on Rome	Writer, director and narrator	Film	94 mins	A documentary about the ascent of fascism in Italy
2024	A Sudden Glimpse to Deeper Things	Writer and director	Film	88 mins	A documentary about artist Wilhelmina Barns-Graham
2026	The Story of Documentary Film	Writer and director	Film	960 mins	A documentary on the history of documentary film

== Bibliography ==
Year	Title	Publisher	Notes
1996	Imagining Reality: The Faber Book of Documentary	Faber and Faber	Co-Edited by Kevin Macdonald
2002	Scene by Scene	Laurence King Publishing	Based upon the BBC TV Series of the same name.
2004	The Story of Film: Book	Pavilion Books	re-issued in 2011 and 2021
2008	Widescreen: Watching Real People Elsewhere	Columbia University Press	
2017	The Story of Looking	Canongate Books	re-issued in 2021

== Awards and nominations ==
Year	Nominated Work	Awards	Category	Result
2009	The First Movie	Berlin International Film Festival	Manfred Salzgeber Award	Won
2010	The First Movie	Prix Italia	Best Arts or Performing Arts Documentary	Won
2010	The First Movie	Royal Television Society	Best Arts Documentary	Nominated
2010	The First Movie	Real to Reel Film and Video Festival	Children's Jury Prize	Won
2010	The New Ten Commandments	Scottish Refugee Film Festival	Best Broadcast Award	Won
2010	The New Ten Commandments	DokumentART Festival	Jury Award	Won
2011	The First Movie	BAFTA Scotland Award	Best Single Documentary	Nominated
2012	The Story of Film: An Odyssey	Palm Springs International Film Festival	Best Documentary Feature	Nominated
2012	The Story of Film: An Odyssey	Traverse City Film Festival	Stanley Kubrick Award	Won
2012	What is this Film Called Love?	Torino Film Festival	Best International Documentary Film	Nominated
2012	Himself	Screen International Annual Awards	Screen International Award	Nominated
2012	Himself	London Awards for Art and Performance	Award for Film	Nominated
2013	The Story of Film: An Odyssey	Peabody Awards		Won
2013	Here be Dragons	BFI London Film Festival	Grierson Award	Nominated
2013	Here be Dragons	Adelaide Film Festival	Best Documentary	Nominated
2014	Life May Be	New Horizons Film Festival	Films on Art International Competition	Nominated
2014	Life May Be	Torino Film Festival	Best International Documentary Film	Nominated
2014	Life May Be	Edinburgh International Film Festival	Best Documentary Feature Film	Nominated
2015	Life May Be	Fribourg International Film Festival	Don Quixote Award	Won
2015	Life May Be	Fribourg International Film Festival	Grand Prix	Nominated
2015	I Am Belfast	Karlovy Vary International Film Festival	Best Documentary	Nominated
2015	I Am Belfast	Adelaide Film Festival	Best Documentary	Nominated
2016	I Am Belfast	Traverse City Film Festival	Stanley Kubrick Award	Won
2018	Women Make Film: A New Road Movie Through Cinema	Venice Film Festival	Venezia Classici Award	Nominated
2018	The Eyes of Orson Welles	Adelaide Film Festival	International Documentary Award	Nominated
2018	The Eyes of Orson Welles	Biografilm Festival	Best Film Unipol Award	Nominated
2018	The Eyes of Orson Welles	Cannes Film Festival	Special Mention	Won
2018	The Eyes of Orson Welles	Cannes Film Festival	L'Œil d'or	Nominated
2018	The Eyes of Orson Welles	Edinburgh International Film Festival	Best Documentary Feature Film	Nominated
2018	The Eyes of Orson Welles	Odesa International Film Festival	Best European Documentary	Nominated
2019	The Eyes of Orson Welles	Barcelona-Sant Jordi International Film Festival	Critics Choice Award	Won
2019	Himself	British Association of Film, Television and Screen Studies (BAFTSS)	Outstanding Achievement Award	Won
2020	Women Make Film: A New Road Movie Through Cinema	European Film Awards	Innovative Storytelling	Won
2020	Women Make Film: A New Road Movie Through Cinema	Dublin International Film Festival	Best Documentary – Special Mention	Won
2021	The Story of Looking	Seville European Film Festival	New Waves Award	Won
2021	The Storms of Jeremy Thomas	Cannes Film Festival	L'Œil d'or	Nominated
2021	The Story of Film: A New Generation	Cannes Film Festival	L'Œil d'or	Nominated
2021	The Story of Film: A New Generation	Stockholm Film Festival	Bronze Horse	Nominated
2024	A Sudden Glimpse to Deeper Things	Karlovy Vary International Film Festival	Crystal Globe for best feature film	Won

== Festival accolades ==
Film Festival	Film	Notes
Edinburgh International Film Festival	The New Ten Commandments	Official Selection
Sheffield DocFest	The New Ten Commandments	Official Selection
International Film Festival Rotterdam	The New Ten Commandments	Official Selection
DokumentART Festival	The New Ten Commandments	Official Selection
Scottish Refugee Film Festival	The New Ten Commandments	Official Selection
South by Southwest Film Festival	The First Movie	Official Selection
Berlin International Film Festival	The First Movie	Official Selection
Telluride Film Festival	The First Movie	Official Selection
Palm Springs International Film Festival	The First Movie	Official Selection
Real to Reel Film and Video Festival	The First Movie	Official Selection
Prix Italia	The First Movie	Official Selection
European Feature Documentary Film Festival – Belgrade	The First Movie	Official Selection
Karlovy Vary International Film Festival	The First Movie	Official Selection
Thessaloniki Documentary Festival	The First Movie	Official Selection
Berlin International Film Festival	The Story of Film: An Odyssey	Official Selection
Toronto International Film Festival	The Story of Film: An Odyssey	Official Selection
Telluride Film Festival	The Story of Film: An Odyssey	Official Selection
Mill Valley Film Festival	The Story of Film: An Odyssey	Official Selection
Istanbul Film Festival	The Story of Film: An Odyssey	Official Selection
Palm Springs International Film Festival	The Story of Film: An Odyssey	Official Selection
Traverse City Film Festival	The Story of Film: An Odyssey	Official Selection
Tallinn Black Nights Film Festival	60 Seconds of Solitude in Year Zero	Official Selection
Edinburgh International Film Festival	What is this Film Called Love?	Official Selection
Telluride Film Festival	What is this Film Called Love?	Official Selection
Karlovy Vary International Film Festival	What is this Film Called Love?	Official Selection
Berwick Film & Media Arts Festival	What is this Film Called Love?	Official Selection
Copenhagen International Documentary Festival	What is this Film Called Love?	Official Selection
Morelia International Film Festival	What is this Film Called Love?	Official Selection
New Horizons Film Festival	What is this Film Called Love?	Official Selection
Edinburgh International Film Festival	A Story of Children and Film	Official Selection
Toronto International Film Festival	A Story of Children and Film	Official Selection
Vancouver International Film Festival	A Story of Children and Film	Official Selection
Cannes Film Festival	A Story of Children and Film	Official Selection
Karlovy Vary International Film Festival	A Story of Children and Film	Official Selection
Two Riversides Film and Art Festival	A Story of Children and Film	Official Selection
Reykjavik International Film Festival	A Story of Children and Film	Official Selection
Hawaii International Film Festival	A Story of Children and Film	Official Selection
Stockholm International Film Festival	A Story of Children and Film	Official Selection
Dubai International Film Festival	A Story of Children and Film	Official Selection
Hong Kong International Film Festival	A Story of Children and Film	Official Selection
BUFF International Film Festival	A Story of Children and Film	Official Selection
San Francisco International Film Festival	A Story of Children and Film	Official Selection
Sydney Film Festival	A Story of Children and Film	Official Selection
Thessaloniki Documentary Festival	A Story of Children and Film	Official Selection
Brighton Festival	A Story of Children and Film	Official Selection
BFI London Film Festival	Here be Dragons	Official Selection
Telluride Film Festival	Here be Dragons	Official Selection
Adelaide Film Festival	Here be Dragons	Official Selection
Cinéma du Réel	Here be Dragons	Official Selection
Edinburgh International Film Festival	Life May Be	Official Selection
Torino Film Festival	Life May Be	Official Selection
Fribourg International Film Festival	Life May Be	Official Selection
Karlovy Vary International Film Festival	Life May Be	Official Selection
Beirut International Film Festival	Life May Be	Official Selection
São Paulo International Film Festival	Life May Be	Official Selection
Brisbane International Film Festival	Life May Be	Official Selection
Göteborg Film Festival	Life May Be	Official Selection
Tempo Documentary Festival	Life May Be	Official Selection
Buenos Aires International Festival of Independent Cinema	Life May Be	Official Selection
New Horizons Film Festival	Life May Be	Official Selection
BFI London Film Festival	The Film That Buys the Cinema	Official Selection
London Short Film Festival	The Film That Buys the Cinema	Official Selection
Lichter Filmfest Frankfurt International	The Film That Buys the Cinema	Official Selection
Kyiv International Short Film Festival	The Film That Buys the Cinema	Official Selection
Kino Climates Weekend	The Film That Buys the Cinema	Official Selection
Leeds International Film Festival	The Film That Buys the Cinema	Official Selection
BFI London Film Festival	6 Desires: D. H. Lawrence and Sardinia	Official Selection
Sundance Film Festival	6 Desires: D. H. Lawrence and Sardinia	Official Selection
Sundance Film Festival	6 Desires: D. H. Lawrence and Sardinia	Official Selection
Buenos Aires International Festival of Independent Cinema	6 Desires: D. H. Lawrence and Sardinia	Official Selection
Edinburgh International Film Festival	6 Desires: D. H. Lawrence and Sardinia	Official Selection
Belfast Film Festival	I Am Belfast	Official Selection
Karlovy Vary International Film Festival	I Am Belfast	Official Selection
BFI London Film Festival	I Am Belfast	Official Selection
Adelaide Film Festival	I Am Belfast	Official Selection
Thessaloniki Documentary Festival	I Am Belfast	Official Selection
South by Southwest Film Festival	I Am Belfast	Official Selection
Seattle International Film Festival	I Am Belfast	Official Selection
Haifa Film Festival	I Am Belfast	Official Selection
Biografilm Festival	I Am Belfast	Official Selection
Glasgow Film Festival	I Am Belfast	Official Selection
Traverse City Film Festival	I Am Belfast	Official Selection
Göteborg Film Festival	Atomic, Living in Dread and Promise	Official Selection
Thessaloniki Documentary Festival	Atomic, Living in Dread and Promise	Official Selection
Amsterdam International Documentary Film Festival	Atomic, Living in Dread and Promise	Official Selection
Stockholm International Film Festival	Stockholm, My Love	Official Selection
Karlovy Vary International Film Festival	Stockholm, My Love	Official Selection
Belfast Film Festival	Stockholm, My Love	Official Selection
São Paulo International Film Festival	Stockholm, My Love	Official Selection
International Film Festival Rotterdam	Bigger Than The Shining	Official Selection
Edinburgh International Film Festival	Bigger Than The Shining	Official Selection
Cannes Film Festival	The Eyes of Orson Welles	Official Selection
Biografilm Festival	The Eyes of Orson Welles	Official Selection
Edinburgh International Film Festival	The Eyes of Orson Welles	Official Selection
Foyle Film Festival	The Eyes of Orson Welles	Official Selection
Galway Film Fleadh	The Eyes of Orson Welles	Official Selection
Odesa International Film Festival	The Eyes of Orson Welles	Official Selection
Traverse City Film Festival	The Eyes of Orson Welles	Official Selection
Bergen International Film Festival	The Eyes of Orson Welles	Official Selection
Adelaide Film Festival	The Eyes of Orson Welles	Official Selection
Amsterdam International Documentary Film Festival	The Eyes of Orson Welles	Official Selection
Barcelona-Sant Jordi International Film Festival	The Eyes of Orson Welles	Official Selection
Göteborg Film Festival	The Eyes of Orson Welles	Official Selection
Chongqing Youth Film Festival	The Eyes of Orson Welles	Official Selection
Rio de Janeiro International Film Festival	The Eyes of Orson Welles	Official Selection
Mumbai Film Festival	The Eyes of Orson Welles	Official Selection
Golden Horse Film Festival	The Eyes of Orson Welles	Official Selection
Hong Kong International Film Festival	The Eyes of Orson Welles	Official Selection
Athens International Film Festival	The Eyes of Orson Welles	Official Selection
Hawaii International Film Festival	The Eyes of Orson Welles	Official Selection
Sheffield DocFest	The Eyes of Orson Welles	Official Selection
Karlovy Vary International Film Festival	The Eyes of Orson Welles	Official Selection
Vancouver International Film Festival	The Eyes of Orson Welles	Official Selection
Melbourne International Film Festival	The Eyes of Orson Welles	Official Selection
Telluride Film Festival	The Eyes of Orson Welles	Official Selection
Istanbul Film Festival	The Eyes of Orson Welles	Official Selection
Xining FIRST International Film Festival	The Eyes of Orson Welles	Official Selection
Edinburgh International Film Festival	Storm in My Heart	Official Selection
International Film Festival Rotterdam	Storm in My Heart	Official Selection
Seattle International Film Festival	Storm in My Heart	Official Selection
Göteborg Film Festival	Storm in My Heart	Official Selection
Dublin International Film Festival	Women Make Film: A New Road Movie Through Cinema	Official Selection
European Film Awards	Women Make Film: A New Road Movie Through Cinema	Official Selection
Venice Film Festival	Women Make Film: A New Road Movie Through Cinema	Official Selection
Toronto International Film Festival	Women Make Film: A New Road Movie Through Cinema	Official Selection
Telluride Film Festival	Women Make Film: A New Road Movie Through Cinema	Official Selection
Museum of Modern Art (MoMA) Documentary Fortnightl	Women Make Film: A New Road Movie Through Cinema	Official Selection
New Femininity Film Festival	Women Make Film: A New Road Movie Through Cinema	Official Selection
Ghent Film Festival	Women Make Film: A New Road Movie Through Cinema	Official Selection
Seville European Film Festival	Women Make Film: A New Road Movie Through Cinema	Official Selection
Melbourne International Film Festival	Women Make Film: A New Road Movie Through Cinema	Official Selection
Melbourne International Documentary Festival	Women Make Film: A New Road Movie Through Cinema	Official Selection
Belfast Film Festival	Women Make Film: A New Road Movie Through Cinema	Official Selection
BFI London Film Festival	Women Make Film: A New Road Movie Through Cinema	Official Selection
It's All True – International Documentary Film Festival	40 Days to Learn Film	Official Selection
DocuDays UA International Human Rights Documentary Film Festival	Alexander's Film	Official Selection
Cannes Classics Selection (Cannes Film Festival)	The Storms of Jeremy Thomas	Official Selection
Vienna International Film Festival	The Storms of Jeremy Thomas	Official Selection
Belfast Film Festival	The Storms of Jeremy Thomas	Official Selection
BFI London Film Festival	The Storms of Jeremy Thomas	Official Selection
Sheffield DocFest	The Story of Looking	Official Selection
Telluride Film Festival	The Story of Looking	Official Selection
Seville European Film Festival	The Story of Looking	Official Selection
Reykjavik International Film Festival	The Story of Looking	Official Selection
Doclisboa International Film Festival	The Story of Looking	Official Selection
Cannes Film Festival	The Story of Film: A New Generation	Official Selection
BFI London Film Festival	The Story of Film: A New Generation	Official Selection
Lumière Film Festival	The Story of Film: A New Generation	Official Selection
Chicago International Film Festival	The Story of Film: A New Generation	Official Selection
Golden Horse Film Festival	The Story of Film: A New Generation	Official Selection
Stockholm International Film Festival	The Story of Film: A New Generation	Official Selection
Palm Springs International Film Festival	The Story of Film: A New Generation	Official Selection
Seville European Film Festival	The Story of Film: A New Generation	Official Selection
Bergen International Film Festival	The Story of Film: A New Generation	Official Selection
Sydney Film Festival	The Story of Film: A New Generation	Official Selection
Foyle Film Festival	The Story of Film: A New Generation	Official Selection
