= Hong Kong Trilogy: Preschooled Preoccupied Preposterous =

2015 Hong Kong film by Christopher Doyle

- Directed by: Christopher Doyle
- Written by: Christopher Doyle
- Produced by: Jenny Suen; Ken Hui
- Starring: Connie Yuen; Thierry Chow; Selene Cheung; Ching Man Lip; Winnie Lau; Miso; Kevin Sherlock; Vodka Wong; Kevin Lau; Chen Feng Zhen
- Cinematography: Christopher Doyle
- Edited by: AQ Lee; Jinpo Yip; Jenny Suen
- Release date: 20 September 2015 (TIFF world premiere)
- Running time: 85 minutes
- Country: Hong Kong
- Languages: Cantonese; English; Mandarin

Hong Kong Trilogy: Preschooled Preoccupied Preposterous (Chinese: 香港三部曲：開門見山、愚公移山、後悔莫及) is a 2015 Hong Kong documentary-fictional hybrid film directed by Christopher Doyle. It's a portrait of Hong Kong told by three generations of real people: “preschooled” children, “preoccupied” young people, and “preposterous” senior citizens.

The film had its world premiere in the "Contemporary World Cinema" section at the 2015 Toronto International Film Festival, where it was described in the Toronto Globe and Mail as a "hybrid of fiction and documentary [which] doesn't use a traditional narrative, but it's not entirely abstract either – it's a contemplative sort of parallel storytelling, one where the elliptical space between fact and fiction combines to make a third creature that is no less true." It was subsequently released in theatres in Hong Kong on 28 September 2015 to mark the one-year anniversary of the Umbrella Movement, and also released in theatres in Germany, Taiwan, Greece, and the United States.

When it was released in the United States, Film Comment named it "Movie of the Week," and critic Jonathan Romney wrote that the "three linked semi-documentary vignettes about a location close to the director's heart—feels as much a community project as a personal statement. It isn't so much an example of the genre known as the 'city symphony'—it's more like a city jam."

== Format ==
Jenny Suen, the film's producer, spent over a year interviewing over a hundred ordinary people in Hong Kong as part of the casting process. She and Doyle then used those recordings as voice-overs to structure a loose narrative that the people were asked to act on-screen. The result is a visual poem in which Christopher Doyle's images run parallel with their words of the characters as they ponder how to live together and what society should be.

Doyle calls this style "realidada," a free-flowing narrative form that owes just as much to the absurdity of real life as it does to the cinematic language through which it was interpreted.

== Plot ==
In "Preschooled," "Little Red Cap" tries to resolve the question "Why are there so many gods in this world? Is it because so many people need to be saved?" by evangelising all the world faiths to her schoolmates. "Vodka Wong" releases plastic turtles to redeem the bad karma that resulted from his parents’ neglect of him.

In "Preoccupied," young people occupy the streets of Central, Hong Kong. They stop the city to think about what they want for their future. Twenty-eight-year-old "Thierry the Feng Shui Master" and her crew of underground rappers and artists give voice to their discontent.

“Lady Swim" and "Mister Li" look "preposterous" as they go on a speed-dating tour of the city trying to reconcile their new energies and the obligations convention has imposed on them.

The characters of each generation wonder how to live. At the end of their journey, they find no explicit answers, instead learning that they are not alone in asking the universal questions of who we are, how we fit in, and what the city wants to become together.

== Director's Statement ==
The way this film evolved demanded a lot more give-and-take, much more “deliberation,” more “intuitive fine-tuning” than a more narrative-driven work. We wanted to give back to Hong Kong at least a fraction of what it has given us. So we started to talk to “real Hong Kong people” to find out what it's like to be them. The children shared their wondrous interpretation of the world. The young people expressed hope and resilience in the face of the lies they feel they have been fed. While the senior citizens who have “seen it all” still laugh and live with the same wonder as the children we began with. The voices of these three generations are the film's dynamic. Their wisdom is unintended, their voices are rarely heard, and their ironies go disregarded. They are the subject and the real authors of this film. As the press and the “kids” encouraged us as we shot on location, at least one had written in a caption of a photo they uploaded to Facebook (of us shooting at the Umbrella Movement campsite): "Please help us film our hopes and dreams." What else can a film be all about?

— Christopher Doyle, 2015

== Production ==
Production began in late 2013, when the Chinese online video site, in conjunction with the Hong Kong International Film Festival, commissioned Doyle to direct a short film, HK 2014 – Education for All, for their omnibus film, Beautiful 2014. The short film that he contributed became the first part of Hong Kong Trilogy. Doyle then decided to build upon the style and expand it into a feature. The rest of the film was shot over the period of one year as Suen interviewed more people and found more locations. The start of the Umbrella Movement and tidal wave of ordinary people taking to the streets to speak out encouraged the filmmakers to incorporate what was happening on the ground into the story and finish the film. In December 2014, the producers launched a Kickstarter campaign for production funds. A total 1,021 backers pledged $124,126, exceeding the original $100,000 goal. It was the first Hong Kong film to successfully use crowdfunding on Kick-starter.

As noted by the New York Times, Hong Kong Trilogy was produced almost entirely outside of the mainstream film establishment. "All I did was create a construct for Hong Kong people to speak," Doyle said. In its quiet way, it depicts the daily life of seven million people who are still looking for their place in the world – a struggling democracy under the shadow of a rising China."

== Select Film Festivals ==
- Toronto International Film Festival (World Premiere) Contemporary World Cinema Section (20 September 2015)
- Busan International Film Festival (Asia Premiere) Wide Angle Documentary Showcase (4 October 2015)
- Copenhagen International Documentary Film Festival (CPH:DOX)
- Camerimage
- Ambulante Documentary Film Festival (Mexico)
- Mumbai Academy of the Moving Image Film Festival (MAMI)
- Taipei Golden Horse Film Festival
- Brisbane Asia Pacific Film Festival (21 November 2015)
- Torino Film Festival (22 November 2015)
- San Francisco International Film Festival (22 April 2015)
- DocAviv Film Festival (21 May 2015), nominated for Depth of Field Award
