= Jenny Suen =

Hong Kong screenwriter, film producer and director (born 1983)

- Born: 孫明莉; December 9, 1983 (age 42); Hong Kong
- Other name: 白海
- Years active: 2015-current

Jenny Suen (born December 9, 1983) is a Hong Kong screenwriter, film producer, and director. She last co-directed The White Girl (2017) with the Australian-Hong Kong cinematographer Christopher Doyle, which premiered at the BFI London Film Festival. She also produced Doyle's Hong Kong Trilogy (2015), which premiered at the Toronto International Film Festival.

== Early life and education ==
Suen was born and raised in Hong Kong.

At eighteen, she moved to the United States to study at the University of Pennsylvania. She graduated in 2006 with a Bachelor of Arts in Comparative Literature, Political Science, East Asian Languages and Civilisation, and a Master of Arts in East Asian Languages and Civilisation. She graduated Phi Beta Kappa, summa cum laude, and was named Dean's Scholar, a distinction only given to nine members of her class.

== Career ==
In 2015, Suen produced Hong Kong Trilogy, a hybrid documentary directed by Doyle, which is a portrait of the city as told by three generations of real Hong Kong people interviewed over the course of one year: children, young people, and the elderly. She raised over US$100,000 on Kickstarter.com to fund the project. The film kicked off a busy festival run after its world premiere at the Toronto International Film Festival. It was released in Hong Kong cinemas September 2015. Upon its theatrical release in the United States, it was named "Film of the Week" by Film Comment, described by critic Jonathan Romney as a "three linked semi-documentary vignettes about a location close to the director’s heart—feels as much a community project as a personal statement. It isn’t so much an example of the genre known as the “city symphony”—it's more like a city jam."

Suen then co-directed with Doyle a film called The White Girl. It's a love story set in the last fishing village of Hong Kong that stars Joe Odagiri and Angela Yuen. Described as a "tropical-noir fairytale", it is set against the backdrop of the fishermen's disappearing culture and way of life. After its 2017 world premiere at the BFI London Film Festival, it screened as a special presentation at the Singapore International Film Festival where it was hailed as "a very accomplished first feature from Suen, [heralding] the coming of a new director with the knowhow and potential to add truly unique offerings to Hong Kong’s film canon". It was nominated for a NETPAC award at the Taipei Golden Horse Film Festival. The film was theatrically released in Hong Kong in 2017 and was released in Japan at the end of 2018.

== Upcoming projects ==
Her first solo directorial debut will be a remake of Vera Chytilova's Czech New Wave masterpiece Daisies in Hong Kong. The project won the top prize at South Korea's Bucheon International Fantastic Film Festival (BIFAN) in 2021. The jury awarded the project in "consideration of the filmmaker’s intrepid vigour and the brilliant premise of transposing the chaotic and critical satire of Vera Chytilova’s Daisies to the milieu of contemporary Hong Kong.” They added that, of all the films in the market, “none felt as timely, as rousing, or as fun as Jenny’s delirious and wonderful vision.”" The film will star Golden Globe Winner Emma Corrin (The Crown) and Cesar Nominee Lucie Zhang (Paris 13th District), and is produced by Coco Francini and Cate Blanchett through their Dirty Films production company.
