= The Great Silence =

1968 film directed by Sergio Corbucci

- Italian film poster by Giuliano Nistri
- Italian: Il grande silenzio
- Directed by: Sergio Corbucci
- Screenplay by: Vittoriano Petrilli; Mario Amendola; Bruno Corbucci; Sergio Corbucci
- Story by: Sergio Corbucci
- Produced by: Attilio Riccio; Robert Dorfmann
- Starring: Jean Louis Trintignant; Klaus Kinski; Frank Wolff; Luigi Pistilli; Mario Brega; Marisa Merlini; Vonetta McGee
- Cinematography: Silvano Ippoliti
- Edited by: Amedeo Salfa
- Music by: Ennio Morricone
- Production companies: Adelphia Compagnia Cinematografica; Les Films Corona
- Distributed by: 20th Century Fox (Italy); Les Films Corona (France)
- Release dates: 22 November 1968 (Italy); 27 January 1969 (France)
- Running time: 105 minutes
- Countries: Italy; France
- Languages: Italian; English
- Box office: ₤309 million (Italy); 570,486 admissions (France); $53,074 (US re-release)

The Great Silence (Italian: Il grande silenzio) is a 1968 spaghetti Western film directed and co-written by Sergio Corbucci. An Italian-French co-production, the film stars Jean-Louis Trintignant, Klaus Kinski, Vonetta McGee (in her film début) and Frank Wolff, with Luigi Pistilli, Mario Brega, Marisa Merlini and Carlo D'Angelo in supporting roles.

Conceived by Corbucci as a politically-charged allegory inspired by the deaths of Che Guevara and Malcolm X, the film's plot takes place in Utah prior to the Great Blizzard of 1899. It pits a mute gunslinger (Trintignant), fighting in the defence of a group of outlaws and a vengeful young widow (McGee), against a group of ruthless bounty killers led by "Loco" (Kinski) and the corrupt banker Henry Pollicut (Pistilli). Unlike most films of the genre, which were filmed in the Almería province of Spain to double for areas such as Texas and Mexico, The Great Silence was primarily filmed on location in the Italian Dolomites.

Distributed in most territories by 20th Century Fox, The Great Silence was theatrically released to a mediocre commercial reception in Italy, but it fared better in other countries. Controversial for its bleak and dark tone, the film's reputation grew, and it gained a cult following in the wake of its release. The film was finally released in the United States in 2001, when it was made available on DVD by Fantoma Films and Image Entertainment; in Britain, it was first shown in 1990 on the BBC2 program Moviedrome.

Having received several theatrical re-releases, most notably in 2012 and 2017, The Great Silence is now widely regarded by fans and authorities on Spaghetti Westerns as one of the greatest films of the genre, and is acknowledged as Corbucci's masterpiece. Praise has gone to the acting, the utilization of snowbound landscapes, Ennio Morricone's score, and the film's subversion of several conventions of the Western film genre. Retrospective critics and scholars of Corbucci's Westerns have also deemed The Great Silence to be the second film in the director's "Mud and Blood" trilogy, which also includes Django (1966) and The Specialists (1969).

== Plot ==
Henry Pollicut and two other bounty killers murder a man named Gordon and his wife. To prevent Gordon's son from giving them away, one of the killers slices the boy's throat, rendering him permanently mute. Pollicut becomes a corrupt Utah banker and justice of the peace.

Years later in 1898, Gordon's son, now going by the moniker "Silence", operates on a principle whereby he provokes his enemies into drawing their weapons first so he can kill them in self-defense with his Mauser C96. A severe blizzard has swept the frontier, bringing privation to the town of Snow Hill. As a result, much of the community is forced to steal in order to survive. Pollicut, seeking to make a profit by attaining their property after they are killed, places prices on the thieves' heads, attracting the attention of a bounty killer gang, which also lists "Loco." As they prey on the outlaws, Silence works with the bandits and their allies to fight against the killers.

One of the outlaws, James Middleton, leaves the safety of the group to be with his wife, Pauline. He is subsequently killed by Loco when he takes Pauline hostage. Vengeful, Pauline writes to Silence, asking him to kill Loco. Meanwhile, the newly elected governor, hoping to have order maintained before declaring an amnesty regarding the outlaws, appoints the righteous but bumbling soldier Gideon Burnett as the sheriff of Snow Hill. On his way, Burnett encounters the outlaws, who steal his horse for food. After getting lost in the snow, Burnett finds a stagecoach travelling to Snow Hill, on which he meets Silence, and later, Loco. Upon arrival, Silence meets Pauline, who promises to raise his reward.

Pauline attempts to sell her house to Pollicut, who demands that she becomes his mistress – his reason for putting a bounty on her husband. Pauline bitterly refuses. Silence leaves for the town saloon and attempts to provoke Loco into drawing. Instead, Loco savagely beats Silence before Silence fights back. Angered, Loco attempts to shoot Silence, but he is stopped by Burnett, who arrests him for attempted murder and prepares to take him to a prison in Tonopah. Before leaving, Burnett requests that the townsfolk provide food for the outlaws. Meanwhile, Pauline becomes romantically and sexually involved with Silence while tending his wounds.

Burnett and Loco stop by a frozen lake to allow Loco to relieve himself, but he springs a trap, shooting the ice surrounding Burnett and leaving him to die in the freezing water. Loco rides to his hideout and convinces the rest of the gang to confront Silence. Determined to take Pauline by force, Pollicut attempts to rape her as his henchman, Martin, tortures Silence by burning his right hand. Silence overpowers Martin and kills Pollicut. Loco and his gang arrive to look for Silence, just as the outlaws appear at the edge of town to collect the provisions, having been previously advised to do so by Burnett. Deciding to use them to draw out Silence, the gang herds the bandits into the saloon and captures Pauline. Loco tells Pauline to have Silence duel with him – if Silence wins, the outlaws will be set free; if he wins, they will be killed.

Despite Pauline's pleas that the duel is a trap, Silence stands outside the saloon. A killer shoots his left hand, greatly impairing his speed and marksmanship. Loco then stands in the doorway, ready to face the weakened Silence. As Silence begins reaching for his Mauser, Loco reaches for his Colt Single Action Army – but as Silence draws, another wounding shot is fired. Loco fires at Silence's head, killing him. Distraught, Pauline attempts to shoot Loco herself but swiftly dies as well. The bounty killers turn their guns on the outlaws, massacring the entire group. As Loco and his men prepare to collect their bounties, he takes Silence's Mauser from Pauline's hands. The killers ride out of Snow Hill into the morning sun.

A title card explains that Loco's actions resulted in widespread public condemnation of bounty killing, and a memorial was erected in Snow Hill to honor those who died by his greed.

=== Alternate endings ===
==== Happy ending ====
Due to the bleak nature of the original finale, Corbucci was obliged to shoot an alternate ending to appease his producers, who wanted the film to have a "seasonal" appeal due to its intended Christmas holiday release. Production histories of The Great Silence previously suggested that this "happy" ending was shot specifically for the North African and Asian markets, although there is no evidence to suggest that this ending was seen in either region. Some of the footage shot for this ending did, however, appear in the film's trailers. Because it was believed that no audio elements for this ending had survived, early DVD releases of the film, such as the American release from Fantoma Films, feature it without sound. Later releases, such as the Film Movement Blu-ray, include the ending with synchronized Italian audio.

In this ending, Loco draws his gun without waiting to be prompted by Silence. Suddenly, Burnett, having survived falling into the frozen lake, rides into town on horseback and shoots Loco in the head, allowing Silence to kill the remaining bounty killers. Burnett frees the outlaws as Pauline takes the bandages on Silence's burnt right hand off, revealing a gauntlet that he used for protection, before applying bandages to his wounded left hand. As Burnett takes the thieves to the local jail to await their amnesty, he asks Silence to become his deputy, which he accepts with a smile.

==== Ambiguous ending ====
Corbucci also delivered another, lesser-known ending to his producers. This version serves as a recut of the intended ending with additional footage not seen in the theatrical version. It was never publicly released until it was included among the special features of Film Movement's Blu-ray.

This ending depicts Silence being shot by Loco's henchman in both of his hands before he can draw his gun; wounded, he collapses to the ground as Pauline watches in shock. Appearing to show a change of heart, Loco gestures to his men to leave the saloon. As a result, the fates of Silence, Pauline and the outlaws are left unknown.

==== Analysis ====
In reviewing the alternate endings, film critic Simon Abrams believes that the producers' rejection of both of the above endings was justified, describing them as "emotionally dissatisfying conclusions for Corbucci's otherwise harrowing anti-fable". While finding the "ambiguous" ending's failures in its lack of answers for the fates of its characters, he considers the "happy" ending "amusing" due to its attempt to overhaul the film's pre-established tone. He also considers the latter to be of interest to fans of Sergio Leone's films due to Silence's gauntlet serving as a possible reference to Joe's use of a bullet-proof sheet of metal in A Fistful of Dollars.

== Cast ==
- Jean-Louis Trintignant as Gordon/"Silence" ("Silenzio" in the Italian version)
  - Loris Loddi as young Silence
- Klaus Kinski as "Loco" ("Tigrero")
- Vonetta McGee as Pauline Middleton
- Frank Wolff as Sheriff Gideon Burnett (Corbett)
- Luigi Pistilli as Henry Pollicut
- Mario Brega as Martin
- Carlo D'Angelo as the Governor of Utah
- Marisa Merlini as Regina, the Saloon Madam (Régine)
- Raf Baldassarre as Sanchez (Bobo Schultz)
- Spartaco Conversi as Walter, Outlaw Leader
- Remo De Angelis as Fake Sheriff in Flashback
- Jacques Dorfmann (Note: Jacques Toulouse on French prints) as Miguel
- Bruno Corazzari as Charlie (uncredited)

== Production ==
=== Development ===
Every time I make a Western, I say "This is the last". I get tired and nervous; I hate the horses and the desert. I go back to town wanting to make a film about a man who drives a car, uses a phone and watches TV. But once I'm there, I start thinking how nothing is finer in the cinema than a horseman, with the setting sun and a red sky. That makes me want to carry on. And I think up another Western with my actors.

— Sergio Corbucci in an interview with Noël Simsolo for Image et Son #246, January 1971

By 1967, Sergio Corbucci had grown weary of making Westerns that varied widely in quality and commercial viability. Having returned to Rome after completing principal photography on the Eurospy film Death on the Run in Athens, he decided that another Western, set during a blizzard — reportedly an homage to two other "snow Westerns", André de Toth's Day of the Outlaw and John Ford's Cheyenne Autumn — would provide a similar change of pace. He had previously considered snowed-in valleys as the setting of Django, although the prior film took place in muddy conditions due to time and budget constraints. According to actor and producer Lars Bloch, this also gave Corbucci an opportunity to visit resorts within the Dolomites, thus allowing him to go on a skiing holiday while making a film. The project was a co-production between the Rome-based production company Adelphia Compagnia Cinematografica and the Paris-based studio Les Films Corona.

Casting English-speaking lead actors in Spaghetti Westerns was a growing practice because it was believed to allow international marketability. Marcello Mastroianni had conceived the idea of a mute gunfighter when he told Corbucci that he had always wanted to appear in a Western, but would have been held back by his inability to speak English. When Corbucci first met Jean-Louis Trintignant, who was hired for the leading role of the film by Les Films Corona after it was turned down by Franco Nero (who had previously played the title character of Django), he learned that Trintignant did not speak English either. To bypass the need for an English-speaking lead, Corbucci decided to turn Trintignant's character into a mute. At the time, Trintignant was known for his role in the critically acclaimed romantic drama A Man and a Woman, and is believed to have accepted the role in support of co-producer Robert Dorfmann, who was a friend of his. Silence was his only role in a Spaghetti Western.

=== Casting ===
Corbucci hired established German actor Klaus Kinski to play Loco, a character who was partially intended to emulate Gorca, the vampire played by Boris Karloff in Mario Bava's Black Sabbath, which served as a major stylistic influence on The Great Silence. Other cast members were established character actors in or outside the Spaghetti Western genre, including Luigi Pistilli, Mario Brega, Marisa Merlini, Raf Baldassare, Carlo D'Angelo, Spartaco Conversi and Bruno Corazzari (an actor often compared to Kinski). Frank Wolff, usually known for playing serious or villainous characters, was cast against type in the semi-comical role of Sheriff Burnett.

Jean-Louis Trintignant and Vonetta McGee on the Elios Film set during the filming of The Great Silence

Vonetta McGee, a then-unknown pre-law San Francisco State College dropout and amateur actress who had moved to Rome to find work at Cinecittà, was cast as Pauline in her first film role. After appearing in Corbucci's film and Luigi Magni's Faustina, McGee was invited to return to America by Sidney Poitier, where she became a major actress in the blaxploitation genre. Alex Cox later cast her as Marlene in his film Repo Man based on her performance as Pauline.

=== Filming ===
Location filming began in late 1967 in Cortina d'Ampezzo (Veneto) and San Cassiano in Badia (South Tyrol). Several Snow Hill scenes were shot on a set specifically built for the film, with log cabins and alpine roofs. Many of the surrounding hills were used for various set-pieces, including Loco's gang's hideout, the way station, the stagecoach route and the Snow Hill graveyard. According to his autobiography Kinski Uncut, Kinski had an on-set affair with actress "Sherene Miller" during the Cortina shoot, while his wife Brigitte and daughter Nastassja enjoyed sledding in the snow. Production then moved to southern areas of Italy; Silence's flashback to his childhood was shot at Bracciano Lake, near Manziana in Lazio. The Elios Film town set in Rome, which had previously been used by Corbucci in Django, was used for several Snow Hill scenes (including the final duel).

Most of the Snow Hill scenes filmed at Elios were shot at night so that the fake "snow" looked more convincing; 26 tons of shaving cream was used to give the street a snowbound look. For the daylight scenes, the Elios set was swathed in fog, to disguise the fact that the surrounding countryside had no snow. Camera overexposure was also occasionally used to avoid continuity errors. The film's costumes were designed by Enrico Job (the husband of director Lina Wertmüller), and were influenced by hippie fashion styles, including mufflers, shawls, and outfits made of fur and leather; Corbucci was known for standing heavily against the hippie subculture. Like other Spaghetti Westerns, the film was shot without direct sound to allow for post-production dubbing in multiple languages; to further accommodate this, Corbucci claimed that he would often direct actors to perform in "numerological diction", a technique also used by Federico Fellini, which required actors to count off numbers in their native language instead of performing lines.

According to McGee, Corbucci was "the nicest man" during production, and "never tried to put the make on" her. The actress attributed this to the frequent presence of his wife Nori on the set, noting that "they were such a happy couple. They made it a great environment to work in." However, at one point while filming, Wolff had to be restrained from strangling Kinski when the latter insulted his Jewish heritage by telling him "I don't want to work with a filthy Jew like you; I'm German and hate Jews." Following the incident, Wolff refused to speak to Kinski unless required to by the script. Kinski later declared that he insulted Wolff because he wanted to help him get into character.

The Great Silence was one of several Spaghetti Westerns produced between 1967 and 1968, along with Enzo G. Castellari's Kill Them All and Come Back Alone and One Dollar Too Many, Sergio Sollima's Run, Man, Run and Sergio Leone's Once Upon a Time in the West, to be showcased in Patrick Morin's made-for-television documentary Western, Italian Style. During the making of the film, Corbucci and Trintignant were interviewed; Corbucci discussed the nature of violence in his films and Spaghetti Westerns in general (comparing the use of violence in such films to the James Bond franchise), while Trintignant spoke of the unusual nature of his role and how he would practice drawing his gun – by pulling a sock (substituting for the gloves Silence wears in the film) off his hand and reaching for a long-stemmed artichoke in his pocket.

=== Post-production ===
Following the film's completion, The Great Silence was, as per standard procedure for a Spaghetti Western, edited in its final, completed form and dubbed into five languages: Italian, French, Spanish, German and English. Subtitled versions were created for foreign markets outside of the dubbed versions. The English-language version was written by John Davis Hart and Lewis E. Ciannelli (the son of Eduardo Ciannelli) and recorded at Via Margutta Studios in Rome under Ciannelli's direction. Among the voice actors for the English version were Carolyn De Fonseca, Edward Mannix, Ted Rusoff and Mel Welles.

Although Hart and Ciannelli's dub script remains relatively faithful to the original Italian dialogue, the meaning of numerous lines and scenes were changed; Ciannelli in particular frequently embellished the dialogue of films in the dubbing stage, such as Arizona Colt. Much of the dialogue concerning the outlaws, such as a remark made by Walter, the leader of the bandits, about their forthcoming amnesty, as well as Loco's conversation with Burnett about the morality of the thieves, were rewritten to imply that most of the outlaws were being persecuted not simply because of their poverty, but for also practising Mormonism. Several of the characters' names were also changed from Corbucci's originals, for example, "Tigrero" became "Loco", "Sheriff Gideon Corbett" changed to "Sheriff Gideon Burnett", and "Bobo Schultz" was renamed "Sanchez".

Film historian Howard Hughes suggests that, despite the implications of a large budget as a result of an international cast, as well as elaborate set and costume designs, there are several aspects that suggest otherwise. These include several continuity errors and revealing mistakes present throughout the film, and a variance in the quality of the film stock. In comparison to the Technicolor/Techniscope presentation most Spaghetti Westerns were filmed in, The Great Silence was filmed in the standard European widescreen format and printed in Eastmancolor.

== Interpretations and themes ==
=== Character and environment subversion ===
The Great Silence has been interpreted by various film critics and historians as a subversion of various conventions of the Western film genre. Corbucci, who made his left-wing views either the subtext or subject of several of his films, wrote the film's story as an allegory highlighting the corruptions stemming from authoritarian forms of capitalism, which are personified by the sadistic, greedy bounty killers led by Loco (who use the bounties to fuel their desires for violence and money while acting under the law), as well as the schemes of the banker Pollicutt. This is partially in line with the "Classical Plot" of both American Westerns (such as Shane) and certain Spaghetti Westerns (such as A Fistful of Dollars), in which, according to Will Wright, a "lone stranger rides into a troubled town and cleans it up, winning the respect of the townsfolk and the love of the schoolmarm." As a result of his sympathetic portrayal of the outlaws and the demoniac characterization of the people who hunt them, Corbucci's presentation of bounty killers is far more negative than such figures in Sergio Leone's films – the closing title card of The Great Silence contrasts with the opening title card of For a Few Dollars More.

A key aspect of the film that differentiates its stylistic choices from other Westerns is its setting – a snow-bound Utah that contrasts with the desert plains seen in most Western films, American or Italian. The bleakness of the winter landscape complements the dark and pessimistic tone of the film, while providing motivation for the characters, as the living conditions and chances of survival are made more dire. The snowy backdrop isolates the events of the story by providing very little visible geographical detail, and "fair metaphors for the enclosed, cruel world herein" are created.

=== Subversion of protagonist ===
Silence rides through a valley in a scene that is referenced in the opening of Quentin Tarantino's The Hateful Eight. Silvano Ippoliti's cinematography frequently relies on tonal contrasts between different areas of the landscape.

In his analysis of the film, Donato Totaro compares Silence to other Spaghetti Western protagonists, and analyses him in Freudian terms – he is dressed in black (like Corbucci's previous creation, Django), is extremely fast and accurate with his gun, and is anti-heroic, sharing some of his characteristics with Loco (both will kill other people on the grounds that they will receive payment). However, unlike other "strong and silent" Spaghetti Western characters, such as Django or Joe from A Fistful of Dollars, Silence is completely mute, giving him a sense of vulnerability and sensitivity. In contrast to the Colt Single Action Army revolvers used by his fellow Spaghetti Western protagonists and the other characters in the film, Silence's choice of weapon is a semi-automatic Mauser C96 – its rapid rate of fire gives him an unfair advantage over his opponents, therefore his marksmanship comes in part from technological, not physical, prowess. Like Django and Joe before him, Silence's hands are injured prior to the climax, greatly impeding his marksmanship. However, a further link to the bounty killers he fights is established – due to his throat being cut by their kind, Silence frequently shoots the thumbs of his enemies off, rendering them unable to use a single-action gun. Also, unlike Django and Joe, neither his will to survive nor his advanced weaponry can save Silence in the final duel against Loco. The latter then delivers a "symbolic castration", as described by James Newton, upon the hero by taking the Mauser for himself after killing him.

=== Pauline's role ===
The Great Silence, as with many of Corbucci's Westerns, is known for its depictions of strong-willed female characters, namely the mother of the young outlaw Miguel (who requests Silence to kill Loco's compatriot Charlie), Regina, the saloon madam who Sheriff Burnett falls for, and Pauline. Because she seeks vengeance for the death of her husband through Silence, falls for him through shared pain and loneliness, and supports him until they are both killed by Loco, Pauline plays a vital part in the film's narrative. She is also shown to be readily in control of her sexuality, as seen in her refusals to become Pollicut's mistress and her seduction of Silence as she tends to his wounds. Pauline is also African-American, and her interracial love scene with Silence has been seen as highly subversive, both in the context of Western films and commercial cinema as a whole. Corbucci later commented:

People don't go to the cinema to see love scenes. Buñuel was right when he said the most embarrassing thing, for a filmmaker, is to point a camera at a couple kissing. Nothing is more banal than a kiss. Generally you can't have love scenes in stories which are action-based – though in The Great Silence I shot quite a beautiful love scene between a black woman and a mute. There was something very beautiful and very morbid about it. This was the only love scene I ever included in a film of this genre, where the women are generally bizarre.

=== Deaths of protagonists ===
The deaths of Silence, Pauline and the outlaws at the hands of Loco and his gang are a culmination of the subversive elements of The Great Silence and its anti-authoritarian stance. Killing sympathetic or leading characters was not a new tactic to Corbucci – the title character of his second Western, Minnesota Clay, was seemingly killed at the end of the film's American prints. However, the political context of the later film plays a major factor in the presentation of its thematic concerns: when interviewed by the German magazine Film, Corbucci revealed that he had dedicated The Great Silence to the memories of Che Guevara, Martin Luther King Jr. and Robert F. Kennedy, as he believed that their assassinations (all three happening while he was making the film) served to further their causes and resulted in widespread condemnations of violence.Alex Cox elaborates:

Corbucci's widow, Nori, told [producer] Katsumi Ishikuma that her husband had the deaths of [Guevara] and Malcolm X in mind when he conceived The Great Silence ... For the radical, for the revolutionary, both deaths were terrible news. You could only take on the powerful and the wicked for a short while, it seemed, before they crushed you.

In contrast to the deaths of leading characters in similarly countercultural films of the time, such of Ben, Duane Jones' character in Night of the Living Dead, and Wyatt and Billy (Peter Fonda and Dennis Hopper) in Easy Rider, in which said characters are killed by members of similarly disenfranchised groups, the bounty killers are working as part of the State, acting in the service of capital by helping to protect it. What further separates the deaths of the heroes and the anti-authoritarian position of The Great Silence from Romero and Hopper's films is that, unlike Night of the Living Dead and Easy Rider, which were produced without the restrictions of well-established genre conventions, Corbucci's film also subverts and comments on the genre that it is part of; in contrast to the relatively rare circumstances of the face-to-face gunfight at the O.K. Corral — which provided the primary template for cinematic depictions of Old West duels — actual shootouts of the era tended to closer resemble ambushes like the one committed by Loco and his gang. Donato Totaro states that the film's title "is rich in possible meaning, suggestive not only of the great white expansive snow, the lead character's muteness, but the late 1960s political defeats that impacted Corbucci's mood that led him to make one of the grimmest Westerns ever made".

Cox believes that the moral message of the film is that "sometimes, even though you know you'll fail, you still do the right thing". He also adds that by facing an unbeatable foe and dying in the ensuing duel, Silence "becomes the noblest hero of any Western film since Shane".

== Soundtrack ==
The Great Silence

Soundtrack album by Ennio Morricone
- Length: 34:43
- Label: Parade

The Great Silence's soundtrack was composed by Ennio Morricone, Corbucci's frequent musical collaborator since Navajo Joe, and conducted by Bruno Nicolai. A melancholic, emotive score, Morricone personally viewed it as his best Spaghetti Western soundtrack aside from his compositions for Sergio Leone. The soundtrack was released on CD, also containing five tracks from Morricone's score for That Splendid November, in 1995, 2005 and 2014. A limited edition LP (consisting of 500 copies) was released by Dagored in April 2016.

In reviewing Morricone's score for Electric Sheep Magazine, Robert Barry expressed that the compositions of the film eschew "the soaring heroic melodies and pounding horse-hoof rhythms of the Leone films" and that the music closely resembles Morricone's own 1970s horror film soundtracks, Florian Fricke's music for Werner Herzog's films, and modernist compositions by Luciano Berio and Pierre Boulez. He also noted that solo violins (playing fifth intervals) and flutes are used in creating Wagnerian leitmotifs to highlight Silence's conflict within the society he is placed in.

In reviewing Morricone's soundtrack for CineAction, Mark Lager described how "The celeste and choir of Silence’s theme (“Restless”) and the trilling flutes of his painful childhood scar show his status as an eternal outsider and wanderer as he drifts through the snowy forest and mountain scenery. The diabolical cackle of the trumpets shows the sinister sneer of bounty hunter Loco (Klaus Kinski) as he guns down his hapless victims. The soaring strings in this score are only present during the love making (“Invito all’Amore”) of Pauline (Vonetta McGee) and Silence (Jean-Louis Trintignant)—a striking scene for its time in its presentation of interracial romance. The strings are otherwise dirgelike and funereal—summoning an existential emptiness of facing the infinite void in the climax (“L’Ultimo Gesto”). “Voci Nel Deserto” is a haunting and sorrowful prayer for the dead: a requiem for the lost lives of 1968."

=== Track listing ===
All tracks are written by Ennio Morricone and conducted by Bruno Nicolai.

Side one
No.	Title	Length
1.	"Il Grande Silenzio (Restless)"	2:29
2.	"Passaggi Nel Tempo"	2:55
3.	"E L'Amore Verra'"	1:58
4.	"Barbara E Tagliente"	2:02
5.	"Prima Che Volino I Corvi"	2:31
6.	"Immobile"	3:32
7.	"Viaggio"	1:54

Side two
No.	Title	Length
1.	"Voci Nel Vento"	2:42
2.	"Gli Assassini E La Madre"	3:21
3.	"Invito All'Amore (Silent Love)"	4:00
4.	"Nel Vecchio Saloon"	1:11
5.	"L'Ultimo Gesto"	4:27
6.	"Dopo Il Martirio"	1:41

=== Subsequent music covers and samples ===
The Russian progressive rock band Little Tragedies, the Hungarian band Yesterdays and the Italian group N.O.T. (Noise Overtones Therapy) composed and performed 20-minute pieces based on the film, titled The Voice of Silence, Suite Pauline and Epilogo respectively, as part of the Colossus Project, a musical project set up by the Finnish Progressive Music Association to encourage bands and musical artists to musically interpret the film and other Spaghetti Westerns. The songs were released on the album The Spaghetti Epic Volume Three – The Greatest Silence.

Morricone's music was sampled and remixed by Thievery Corporation for the album Morricone Rmx. The grindcore band Cripple Bastards released an album with the film's Italian title. Anima Morte also recorded a version of the main theme for the 2010 compilation album Cani Arrabbiati – Opening Themes ... A Tribute.

== Release ==
The Great Silence was released in Italy in November 1968. Due to its graphic violence, the film was awarded an 18 rating in Italy, limiting its domestic box office returns. It performed better in the French and West German markets, largely due to the presence of Trintignant and Kinski. It has been reported that during a screening of the film in Sicily one audience member fired a gun at the screen in anger over the film's ending. The film was released in France on 27 January 1969. In Japan, The Great Silence received a theatrical re-release alongside another Corbucci film, Sonny & Jed, through Cable Hogue and PSC in 1995 as part of a "Spaghetti Western Revival" event.

=== Proposed remake and English release ===
Film poster for Film Movement's 2018 North American re-release, by Midnight Marauder and Tony Stella

When The Great Silence was screened for Darryl F. Zanuck of 20th Century Fox to see whether the film could be released on the American market, he was offended by the film (to the point where he reportedly all but swallowed the cigar he was smoking in shock upon watching the ending), and refused to distribute it in the United States. 20th Century Fox did, however, distribute the film in Italy and several other markets. The company also considered a remake of the film starring Clint Eastwood, which eventually evolved into a largely unrelated project by Universal Pictures, Joe Kidd.

The Great Silence made its British premiere on BBC2's Moviedrome block on August 26, 1990, under the title of The Big Silence, where the film was introduced by Alex Cox. Under license from the film's current exhibition rights holder, Beta Film, its first US theatrical release took place in 2012, when an English-dubbed 35 mm film print owned by Swiss film library Kinemathek Le Bon Film was toured in cinema screens across the country. A German-dubbed, English-subtitled print was also screened from November 14 to 25 that same year at the Brisbane International Film Festival.

Following initial screenings at the Festival du Nouveau Cinema, beginning on October 4, 2017, Film Movement announced on October 21 that they had acquired all North American distribution rights to The Great Silence, resulting from a deal that had been brokered between the distributor's president, Michael E. Rosenberg, and Oliver Bachert of Beta Film. The announcement revealed that the film would receive a theatrical re-release in North American theatres, followed by a release on Blu-ray Disc and digital formats. Regarding the acquisition, Rosenberg commented "Following our experiences releasing Time To Die in the States for the very first time, we’re excited to sidle up to bring yet another restored classic western to North American moviegoers, certain to be thrilled by Corbucci’s masterful dark vision". The film began screening in American cinemas on November 12, 2017, at the Alamo Drafthouse Cinema in Winchester, utilizing a 2K restoration of the original negative created by Compass Film SRL. Between April 1 and September 27, 2018, the film earned $53,074 from its North American theatrical run.

=== Home media release ===
Fantoma Films and Image Entertainment released The Great Silence on DVD on September 4, 2001, with their release being the film's first appearance on the American market. The release used an English-language print that was digitally remastered by Zoetrope Aubry Productions, presented in 1.66:1 aspect letterboxed widescreen, with the only audio option being a Dolby Digital Mono mix of the English dub. The DVD's special features consist of a video introduction to the film by Alex Cox, the alternative happy ending (with optional commentary by Cox), and the English version of the film's trailer. Fantoma reissued the disc on January 27, 2004. Glenn Erickson felt that the transfer on Fantoma's DVD was "reasonable but not great" due to the transfer having washed-out colors despite being clean from damage. Erickson also felt that the English dub "still plays as artificial and false, and detracts mightily from Kinski's performance" despite praising the voice acting itself.

In the UK, Digital Classics also released their first DVD of the film in 2004; this release includes the English dub alongside the Italian track with English subtitles, the trailer and the alternative happy ending, but lacks Cox's introduction and commentary. Australian distributor Beyond Home Entertainment's release is identical to Digital Classics' initial release. Digital Classics later issued a second DVD of the film, using an anamorphic widescreen transfer, featuring both the English and Italian tracks, English subtitles and the special features from Fantoma's DVD.

On February 6, 2013, TC Entertainment released The Great Silence on Blu-ray Disc in Japan, using a 1080i, AVC-encoded high-definition transfer of an Italian print and DTS-HD Mono mixes of the Italian, English and Japanese dubs. This release includes the alternative happy ending, the English opening and credits, English and German theatrical trailers, a subtitled interview with Nori Corbucci, a text-based historical overview of bounty hunting and illustrated liner notes as special features. Reviewing the disc for Rock! Shock! Pop!, Ian Jane criticized the disc for the poor quality of its transfer, stating that it "doesn't offer much of an upgrade over that older DVD release at all", and expressed that the film deserved a better high-definition treatment.

German distributor AL!VE re-released the film with remastered, high-definition video and audio (with options for German, Italian and French) on Blu-ray and DVD on December 8, 2017. Their releases include the alternative happy ending, trailers, an audio commentary by filmmaker Mike Siegel, an alternative German version of the film, several featurettes and image galleries, and a liner notes booklet.

Following their theatrical release, Film Movement released The Great Silence on Blu-ray and DVD in the US and Canada on June 5, 2018. Presenting the film using with the same 2K restoration from the theatrical run, the disc includes Italian LPCM Mono (with optional English subtitles) and English Dolby Digital Mono audio options. Extras include "Cox on Corbucci", a featurette in which Cox discusses the film and its significance in the context of Corbucci's career, the documentary Western, Italian Style, the alternative happy ending (with optional commentary by Cox) and the previously unreleased "ambiguous" recut of the ending, both with restored audio, original and re-release theatrical trailers, and a liner notes booklet featuring "Ending the Silence", an essay about the film by Simon Abrams. Film Movement's release received positive notices from DoBlu.com, DVD Compare, Rock! Shock! Pop! and Slant Magazine, whose reviewers singled out the video, Italian audio and extras for praise, while deeming the English dub to have been handled with less attention.

British distributor Eureka Entertainment released the film on Blu-ray as the 257th entry in its Masters of Cinema series on November 22, 2021. Presented in a 2K restoration with Italian and English audio options (with English subtitles for the former), this release includes three audio commentaries: one with author Howard Hughes and filmmaker Richard Knew, another with Siegel, and a third with Cox. Other special features include both alternative endings, Western, Italian Style, the "Cox on Corbucci" featurette from Film Movement's release, a new interview with Radical Frontiers in the Spaghetti Western: Politics, Violence and Popular Italian Cinema author Austin Fisher, trailers and image galleries. The initial print run of 3000 copies of the disc also includes a slipcase, a reversible poster, four facsimiles of promotional lobby cards from the film's original release, and a liner notes booklet featuring essays by Hughes.

=== 4K restoration ===
In March 2017, the Cinémathèque Française reported that Cineteca Nazionale, with the cooperation of Italian distribution rights holder Movietime, had authorised a complete restoration of The Great Silence (including the alternative ending) from the original camera and sound negatives in 4K resolution. The restoration was carried out at the film laboratories Augustus Color and Studio Cine in Rome.

== Critical reception ==
=== Retrospective reviews ===
The Great Silence has a 100% approval rating on Rotten Tomatoes, based on 14 reviews with an average rating of 8.1 out of 10.

Although The Big Silence is [Corbucci's] best film, it has never been shown publicly here or in the United States. It's easy to see why. The film, like most Italian westerns, is incredibly bleak and pessimistic; but worse, it has the most horrible ending of any film I've ever seen ... The beginning of The Big Silence is a little ragged, but bear with it. Once you're aboard the stagecoach with Trintignant and Klaus Kinski – who plays the politest murderer out west – you're in for an amazing ride. The music is by Ennio Morricone: it's a great and very unusual score.

— Alex Cox in his introduction to The Great Silence on Moviedrome, August 26, 1990

It has been widely acclaimed by critics and audiences, and has appeared on numerous lists of the best Spaghetti Western films compiled by audiences, filmmakers and historians. Alongside Django, it is usually regarded as Corbucci's best film and one of the best Spaghetti Westerns not to be directed by Sergio Leone. A contemporary review of The Great Silence in the French newspaper Le Populaire described Corbucci as "an excellent creator of atmosphere and a director perfectly at ease with actors: Klaus Kinski [...] is excellent here".

Time Out gave the film a mostly positive review, writing, "While Django remains the erratic Corbucci's best picture, this slightly later spaghetti Western does well by an inventive set-up [...] between the bullets there's engaging stuff from the two stars and an unmistakable chill in the air". Film critic Leonard Maltin praised the film, awarding it 3 1/2 out of a possible 4 stars. In his review he wrote that The Great Silence is a "brutal, bleakly beautiful spaghetti Western filmed on stark locations in the Dolomites, with one of the most uncompromising and unforgettable finales ever filmed". Kyle Anderson of Nerdist News described the film as Corbucci's "most artful and daring" Western, one that "pushes the genre to new levels and creates a story unlike anything people were used to, even though it's likely more historically accurate". He concluded his review by stating that "If you're looking for a good time on a Saturday night, I'd say this movie is not what you want, but if you're looking for a dark, violent, thoughtful, and well-made film, look no further".

A movie like (Andre de Toth's) Day of the Outlaw, as famous as it is for being bleak and gritty, is practically a musical in comparison to Il Grande Silenzio.

— Quentin Tarantino, 2012

Glenn Erickson of DVD Talk spoke less enthusiastically about the film, but felt that it was a good Spaghetti Western nonetheless. Although praising the locations, as well as the performances of Kinski and Trintignant, Morricone's score, the realistic approach to the story and Silvano Ippoliti's cinematography, he felt that the characterizations were lacking, adding that Corbucci's direction often "drifts and falters" and lacks the "operatic grandeur" of Leone's films. Erickson also expressed that the film's ending was unsurprising given the nihilistic nature of the rest of the film, but noted that he would have been more shocked by it had he seen the film upon its 1968 theatrical release.

In his analysis of the Spaghetti Western genre, Alex Cox described The Great Silence as Corbucci's "tightest, most relentless Western; his best and his bleakest. It's shot in his trademark messy, over-edited, jerky-zoom style, and its telephoto close-ups are frequently out of focus. Yet it is incredibly beautiful". He voiced praise for Ippoliti's strategy of "shooting through things" (a marked improvement over his work on Navajo Joe), the tight script, the strong female characters and the tragic nature of the ending, rooted in Corbucci's pessimism towards the deaths of radical political leaders. Performance-wise, he described Sheriff Burnett and Regina, the film's equivalent of the "cute/funny" characters that had appeared in Corbucci's earlier Westerns, as "tolerable" due to their senses of dark humor and morality, and praised McGee, Pistilli and Brega's acting. Cox also felt that Kinski's Loco was the actor's finest appearance in a Western, and that Trintignant's performance, which might have seemed doll-like in the hands of actors such as Franco Nero, John Phillip Law and Terence Hill, was pulled off "flawlessly. His character's moral quandary, and decision to sacrifice himself, are perfectly conveyed". Noting that Corbucci seemed proud of The Great Silence – "a great work, a great Spaghetti Western, a great Western, a classic of transgressive cinema" – Cox believes that Zanuck's withholding of the international release and its poor domestic performance were key factors in the decline in quality of Corbucci's output following its release.

=== Reception of US theatrical run ===
During its North American 2017-2018 theatrical run, The Great Silence received enthusiastic notices from several reviewers, who tended to note its influence on Tarantino's work. The New York Times' A. O. Scott felt that the film's "brazen mixing of incompatible elements that defies categorization, imitation or even sober critical assessment. It's anarchic and rigorous, sophisticated and goofy, heartfelt and cynical", and expressed that despite its influence, "this plate of pasta — bitter and pungent, nourishing and perhaps a bit nauseating — should be savored on its own". Simon Abrams, writing for The Village Voice felt that the ending "still hurts so good a half-century later", while Kenneth Turan of Los Angeles Times noted the film's subversive qualities, and particularly praised the opening sequence and McGee's "affecting" performance, concluding that "nothing works out the way these [characters], not to mention audiences who love classic Hollywood westerns, expect. Not even close". Eric Monder of Film Journal International praised the film in its entirety, particularly its political themes and cinematography, as well as the chemistry between Trintignant and McGee and the 2K restoration, which he felt was "so crisp, the production looks like it was finished yesterday".

=== Accolades ===
Shared with Cold Water, Honeysuckle Rose, The Docks of New York and The Changeling, the film won the Best Rediscoveries Award at the 2018 Boston Society of Film Critics Awards following its screening at the Brattle Theatre.

== Influence ==
The Great Silence has influenced the works of Quentin Tarantino. Describing the film as his favorite "snow Western", he has paid homage to it in Django Unchained and The Hateful Eight. Robert Richardson, the cinematographer for The Hateful Eight, noted that he and Tarantino studied The Great Silence's photography to get an understanding of the intimacy Tarantino wanted to achieve in the film. Upon being asked what his favorite Western films were, Richardson responded with "I do love The Great Silence, because Quentin turned me on to it and I love the cinematic nature of that, in the snow. But I'm going with Peckinpah's The Wild Bunch if I've got to pick one".

== See also ==
- List of cult films

== Bibliography ==
- Betti, Liliana (1976). Fellini. Little, Brown. ISBN 0316092304.
- Cox, Alex (2009). 10,000 Ways to Die: A Director's Take on the Spaghetti Western. Oldcastle Books. ISBN 978-1-84243-304-1.
- Cox, Alex (2009). Alex Cox's Introduction to Film: A Director's Perspective. Oldcastle Books. ISBN 9781843447474.
- Fridlund, Bert (2006). The Spaghetti Western: A Thematic Analysis. McFarland. ISBN 0-7864-2507-5.
- Giusti, Marco (2007). Dizionario del western all'italiana, 1st ed. Mondadori. ISBN 978-88-04-57277-0.
- Hughes, Howard (2004). Once Upon A Time in the Italian West: The Filmgoers' Guide to Spaghetti Westerns. I.B. Tauris. ISBN 978-1-85043-896-0.
- Rège, Philippe (2009). Encyclopedia of French Film Directors, Volume 1. Scarecrow Press. ISBN 9780810869394.
