= The New Ten Commandments =

- Directed by: Doug Aubrey; Sana Bilgrami; Mark Cousins; Kenneth Glenaan; Douglas Gordon; David Graham Scott; Nick Higgins; Anna Jones; Alice Nelson; Tilda Swinton; Irvine Welsh
- Produced by: Ewan Angus; Nick Higgins; Carole Sheridan
- Cinematography: Ian Dodds; George Geddes; Minttu Mantynen; Scott Ward
- Edited by: Patricia Gomes; Klaus Heinecke; Timo Langer; Aldo Palumbo
- Music by: Jim Sutherland
- Production companies: Lansdowne Productions; Scottish Documentary Institute
- Release date: 2008
- Running time: 101 minutes
- Country: United Kingdom
- Language: English

The New Ten Commandments is an anthology documentary film which premiered at the Edinburgh International Film Festival in 2008. This documentary film is from a Scottish perception.

The film was produced by Nick Higgins from Lansdowne Productions and Noémie Mendelle from the Scottish Documentary Institute and has 10 film-chapter directors for each of the 10 chapters of the film - Kenny Glenaan, Douglas Gordon, Nick Higgins, Irvine Welsh, Mark Cousins, Sana Bilgrami, Alice Nelson, Tilda Swinton, Doug Aubrey, David Graham Scott and Anna Jones.

The film's unifying theme is human rights in Scotland with each chapter illustrating one of the "New Ten Commandments" - 10 articles chosen from the Universal Declaration of Human Rights.

== The 10 film chapters of The New Ten Commandments ==
1. The Right to Freedom of Assembly - Director, David Graham Scott
2. The Right not to be enslaved - Director, Nick Higgins
3. The Right to a fair trial - Director, Sana Bilgrami
4. The Right to freedom of expression - Director, Doug Aubrey
5. The Right to life - Director, Kenny Glenaan
6. The Right to liberty - Directors, Irvine Welsh & Mark Cousins
7. The Right not to be tortured - Director, Douglas Gordon
8. The Right to asylum - Director, Anna Jones
9. The Right to privacy - Director, Alice Nelson
10. The Right to freedom of thought - Directors, Mark Cousins & Tilda Swinton

The film was scheduled for its first television broadcast as The New 10 Commandments in Scotland on BBC Two Scotland in December 2008.

== Accolades ==
2009 Winner Best Broadcast Award, Refugee Festival, Scotland

2009 Winner Student Jury Award at DokumentART Film Festival, Germany & Poland
