= I Am Belfast =

- Directed by: Mark Cousins
- Written by: Mark Cousins
- Starring: Helena Bereen
- Cinematography: Christopher Doyle
- Release date: 16 April 2015 (Belfast Film Festival)
- Running time: 84 minutes
- Country: United Kingdom

I Am Belfast is a 2015 documentary film about Belfast, directed by Mark Cousins.

== Reception ==
The film holds a 100% approval rating on Rotten Tomatoes based on 17 critical reviews.
