= Moviedrome =

British television film series, 1988–2000

- The first Moviedrome logo seen here in 1988
- Genre: Cinema, cult film
- Directed by: Nick Freand Jones
- Presented by: Alex Cox (1988–1994); Mark Cousins (1997–2000)
- Country of origin: United Kingdom
- Original language: English
- No. of series: 12
- No. of episodes: 162

Production
- Producer: Nick Freand Jones

Original release
- Network: BBC2
- Release: 8 May 1988 – 11 September 1994
- Release: 8 June 1997 – 9 July 2000

Moviedrome was a British television cult film series, produced by the BBC and transmitted on BBC2 from 8 May 1988 to 9 July 2000. Its remit was to broadcast a selection of cult films each with an introduction, first by film director Alex Cox and later by film critic Mark Cousins. The producer and director of the series was Nick Freand Jones. During its run, 207 different films were shown.

== History ==
Moviedrome went into development in the late 1980s when BBC producer Nick Freand Jones put together the idea of screening a number of licensed films available within the BBC archives, some of which that had not yet been broadcast. The idea followed a specific film, considered a cult classic, that would be shown on a weekly basis, preceded by an introduction on the film's background, similar to BBC series The Film Club (1986 to 1991).

Jones looked to director and screenwriter Alex Cox to present the series. Cox, known for his directorial features Repo Man, Sid and Nancy and Walker, had previously introduced John Boorman's crime thriller Point Blank and Robert Altman's The Long Goodbye for The Film Club, and was chosen as the front-man for Moviedrome. Cox applied his own unique style to each introduction, as he would educate the viewer, in detail, on the particular film, exploring the genres and themes present within them. As a rule, early screenings of the series were limited to English language-only films, whereas foreign acquisitions had to be dubbed.

On 8 May 1988, Moviedrome premiered on BBC2, and remained a popular late-night Sunday staple for several years, opening with a previously unseen version of The Wicker Man, containing newly restored footage. During Cox's era on the show, he presented 141 films over seven series; those selected consisting of a wide variety of genres, including westerns, Crime thrillers, horrors, sci-fi films and film noir. From the fourth series onwards, the series began to present some films in double bill format. Titles included Johnny Guitar, One-Eyed Jacks, The Good, the Bad and the Ugly, Five Easy Pieces, Halloween, An American Werewolf in London, Badlands, What Ever Happened to Baby Jane?, The Thing from Another World, Sweet Smell of Success, Sunset Boulevard, Carrie and Invasion of the Body Snatchers plus its 1978 remake. Some even received UK network premieres, such as, The Long Hair of Death, Carnival of Souls, The Terminator, Vamp, Knightriders, Manhunter, Mad Max 2, Dead Ringers, Rabid, Cry-Baby and Cox's 1987 film Walker. The final film presented was Kiss Me Deadly, when the series concluded on 11 September 1994.

The series was revived in 1997, when Alex Cox was replaced with filmmaker and critic Mark Cousins. Cousins' presentation style differed greatly from Cox's, as well as the film selection being that of more contemporary works, rather than the usual classics. Cousins was also less critical, whereas Cox didn’t shy away from pointing out a particular film's bad points if necessary. On 8 June 1997, Moviedrome returned with Scarface, the first of 66 films presented by Cousins. This was followed by Logan's Run, The Fog, Vanishing Point, All That Heaven Allows, Shaft, Thunderbolt and Lightfoot, Videodrome, Walkabout, Don't Look Now, and several network premieres, with Dazed and Confused, Exotica, La Haine, Spanking the Monkey, Darkness in Tallinn, Storyville, Liebestraum, Highway Patrolman, Funny Bones, Leon, Clockers and Prêt-à-Porter. The final episode screened on 9 July 2000 with The Last American Hero.

A documentary, Moviedrome: Welcome to the Cult, was released in 2025.

== Episodes ==
=== Series overview ===
Opening with the title Moviedrome in neon lights, a lone saxophone wails as the camera pulls back to reveal the inside of a desert motel room into which Alex Cox casually enters. The saxophone is an excerpt from Tom Waits's "Small Change (Got Rained On With His Own .38)", from his 1976 album Small Change. In subsequent years, the title sequences became more elaborate and funny.

Series	Presented by	Episodes	Originally released	
Series	Presented by	Episodes	First released	Last released
1	Alex Cox	18	8 May 1988	4 September 1988
2	Alex Cox	18	7 May 1989	10 September 1989
3	Alex Cox	17	6 May 1990	9 September 1990
4	Alex Cox	15	19 May 1991	8 September 1991
5	Alex Cox	14	24 May 1992	30 August 1992
6	Alex Cox	17	30 May 1993	26 September 1993
7	Alex Cox	17	15 May 1994	11 September 1994
8	Mark Cousins	10	8 June 1997	17 August 1997
9	Mark Cousins	9	4 January 1998	8 March 1998
10	Mark Cousins	9	20 September 1998	15 November 1998
11	Mark Cousins	11	18 April 1999	11 July 1999
12	Mark Cousins	7	14 May 2000	9 July 2000

=== Presented by Alex Cox ===
==== Series 1 (1988) ====
No. overall	No. in series	Film	Year	Broadcast date	Ref.
1	1	The Wicker Man	1973	8 May 1988	
2	2	Electra Glide in Blue	1973	15 May 1988	
3	3	Diva	1981	22 May 1988	
4	4	Razorback	1984	29 May 1988	
5	5	Big Wednesday	1978	5 June 1988	
6	6	Fat City	1972	12 June 1988	
7	7	The Last Picture Show	1971	19 June 1988	
8	8	Barbarella	1968	26 June 1988	
9	9	The Hired Hand	1971	3 July 1988	
10	10	Johnny Guitar	1954	10 July 1988	
11	11	The Parallax View (Note: The Parallax View, along with a new Moviedrome introduction, was broadcast on BBC2 on 21 November 1993 as part of a special "JFK Night".)	1974	17 July 1988	
12	12	The Long Hair of Death	1964	24 July 1988	
13	13	Invasion of the Body Snatchers	1956	31 July 1988	
14	14	The Fly	1958	7 August 1988	
15	15	One from the Heart	1982	14 August 1988	
16	16	The Man Who Fell to Earth	1976	21 August 1988	
17	17	The Good, the Bad and the Ugly	1966	28 August 1988	
18	18	One-Eyed Jacks	1961	4 September 1988	

==== Series 2 (1989) ====
No. overall	No. in series	Film	Year	Broadcast date	Ref.
19	1	The Man with X-Ray Eyes	1963	7 May 1989	
20	2	Jabberwocky	1977	14 May 1989	
21	3	D.O.A.	1950	21 May 1989	
22	4	The Thing from Another World	1951	28 May 1989	
23	5	The Incredible Shrinking Man	1957	4 June 1989	
24	6	California Dolls	1981	11 June 1989	
25	7	THX 1138	1971	25 June 1989	
26	8	Stardust Memories	1980	2 July 1989	
27	9	Night of the Comet	1984	9 July 1989	
28	10	The Grissom Gang	1971	16 July 1989	
29	11	Ace in the Hole	1951	23 July 1989	
30	12	Alphaville	1965	30 July 1989	
31	13	Two-Lane Blacktop	1971	6 August 1989	
32	14	Trancers	1984	13 August 1989	
33	15	The Buddy Holly Story	1978	20 August 1989	
34	16	Five Easy Pieces	1970	27 August 1989	
35	17	Sweet Smell of Success	1957	3 September 1989	
36	18	Sunset Boulevard	1950	10 September 1989	

==== Series 3 (1990) ====
No. overall	No. in series	Film	Year	Broadcast date	Ref.
37	1	Assault on Precinct 13	1976	6 May 1990	
38	2	Brazil	1985	13 May 1990	
39	3	Get Carter	1971	20 May 1990	
40	4	Goin' South	1978	27 May 1990	
41	5	Dead of Night	1945	10 June 1990	
42	6	The Terminator	1984	24 June 1990	
43	7	The Honeymoon Killers	1970	1 July 1990	
44	8	Ulzana's Raid	1972	8 July 1990	
45	9	The Loved One	1965	15 July 1990	
46	10	An American Werewolf in London	1981	22 July 1990	
47	11	Yojimbo	1961	29 July 1990	
48	12	A Wedding	1978	5 August 1990	
49	13	The Phenix City Story	1955	12 August 1990	
50	14	Walk on the Wildside	1962	19 August 1990	
51	15	The Big Silence	1968	26 August 1990	
52	16	A Bullet for the General	1966	2 September 1990	
53	17	Down by Law	1986	9 September 1990	

==== Series 4 (1991) ====
No. overall	No. in series	Film	Year	Broadcast date	Ref.
54	1	The Beguiled	1971	19 May 1991	
55	2	Vamp	1986	26 May 1991	
56	3	Knightriders	1981	2 June 1991	
57	4	Something Wild	1986	9 June 1991	
58	5	Carnival of Souls	1962	23 June 1991	
59a	6a	Badlands	1973	30 June 1991	
59b	6b	The Prowler	1951	30 June 1991	
60	7	Performance	1970	7 July 1991	
61	8	At Close Range	1986	14 July 1991	
62a	9a	The Duellists	1977	21 July 1991	
62b	9b	Cape Fear	1962	21 July 1991	
63	10	The Music Lovers	1971	28 July 1991	
64	11	Manhunter	1986	4 August 1991	
65a	12a	Hells Angels on Wheels	1967	18 August 1991	
65b	12b	Rumble Fish	1983	18 August 1991	
66	13	What Ever Happened to Baby Jane?	1962	25 August 1991	
67	14	Solaris	1972	1 September 1991	
68	15	Mishima: A Life in Four Chapters	1985	8 September 1991	

==== Series 5 (1992) ====
No. overall	No. in series	Film	Year	Broadcast date	Ref.
69a	1a	Mad Max 2	1981	24 May 1992	
69b	1b	F for Fake	1973	24 May 1992	
70a	2a	Dead Ringers	1988	31 May 1992	
70b	2b	Rabid	1977	31 May 1992	
71	3	Junior Bonner	1972	7 June 1992	
72	4	The Serpent and the Rainbow	1988	14 June 1992	
73	5	Les Diaboliques	1955	28 June 1992	
74	6	The Spider's Stratagem	1970	5 July 1992	
75	7	Escape from New York	1981	12 July 1992	
76a	8a	Alligator	1980	19 July 1992	
76b	8b	Q – The Winged Serpent	1982	19 July 1992	
77a	9a	Wise Blood	1979	26 July 1992	
77b	9b	Witchfinder General	1968	26 July 1992	
78	10	Lolita	1962	2 August 1992	
79	11	Play Misty for Me	1971	9 August 1992	
80	12	Walker	1987	16 August 1992	
81	13	Tracks	1976	23 August 1992	
82a	14a	The Day of the Locust	1975	30 August 1992	
82b	14b	The Big Knife	1955	30 August 1992	

==== Series 6 (1993) ====
No. overall	No. in series	Film	Year	Broadcast date	Ref.
83	1	Darkman	1990	30 May 1993	
84	2	House of Games	1987	6 June 1993	
85a	3a	Escape from Alcatraz	1979	13 June 1993	
85b	3b	A Man Escaped	1956	13 June 1993	
86	4	The Hill	1965	20 June 1993	
87a	5a	Cry-Baby	1990	27 June 1993	
87b	5b	Lenny	1974	27 June 1993	
88a	6a	Invasion of the Body Snatchers	1978	4 July 1993	
88b	6b	Romance of a Horsethief	1971	4 July 1993	
89a	7a	Gothic	1986	11 July 1993	
89b	7b	The Navigator: A Medieval Odyssey	1988	11 July 1993	
90	8	Weekend	1967	18 July 1993	
91a	9a	Rebel Without a Cause	1955	25 July 1993	
91b	9b	200 Motels	1971	25 July 1993	
92a	10a	Django	1966	1 August 1993	
92b	10b	Grim Prairie Tales	1990	1 August 1993	
93a	11a	Run of the Arrow	1957	8 August 1993	
93b	11b	Verboten!	1959	8 August 1993	
94	12	The Long Riders	1980	15 August 1993	
95	13	The Big Combo	1955	22 August 1993	
96	14	Face to Face	1967	29 August 1993	
97	15	Requiescant	1967	5 September 1993	
98	16	What Have I Done to Deserve This?	1984	19 September 1993	
99	17	Carrie	1976	26 September 1993	

==== Series 7 (1994) ====
No. overall	No. in series	Film	Year	Broadcast date	Ref.
100a	1a	The Andromeda Strain	1971	15 May 1994	
100b	1b	Fiend Without a Face	1958	15 May 1994	
101	2	Talk Radio	1988	22 May 1994	
102	3	Carnal Knowledge	1971	29 May 1994	
103a	4a	Coogan's Bluff	1968	5 June 1994	
103b	4b	The Narrow Margin	1952	5 June 1994	
104	5	The Harder They Come	1972	19 June 1994	
105	6	Salvador	1986	26 June 1994	
106	7	The People Under the Stairs	1991	3 July 1994	
107a	8a	Halloween	1978	10 July 1994	
107b	8b	The Baby	1973	10 July 1994	
108	9	Carny	1980	17 July 1994	
109a	10a	Girl on a Motorcycle	1968	24 July 1994	
109b	10b	Psychomania	1973	24 July 1994	
110a	11a	Race with the Devil	1975	31 July 1994	
110b	11b	Detour	1945	31 July 1994	
111a	12a	Rope	1948	7 August 1994	
111b	12b	84 Charlie Mopic	1989	7 August 1994	
112a	13a	To Sleep with Anger	1990	14 August 1994	
112b	13b	Contempt	1963	14 August 1994	
113a	14a	Excalibur	1981	21 August 1994	
113b	14b	Nothing Lasts Forever	1984	21 August 1994	
114a	15a	Naked Tango	1990	28 August 1994	
114b	15b	Apartment Zero	1989	28 August 1994	
115a	16a	Major Dundee	1965	4 September 1994	
115b	16b	Bring Me the Head of Alfredo Garcia	1974	4 September 1994	
116	17	Kiss Me Deadly	1955	11 September 1994	

=== Presented by Mark Cousins ===
==== Series 8 (1997) ====
No. overall	No. in series	Film	Year	Broadcast date	Ref.
117	1	Scarface	1983	8 June 1997	
118a	2a	Westworld	1973	15 June 1997	
118b	2b	Demon Seed	1977	15 June 1997	
119a	3a	The Fly	1986	22 June 1997	
119b	3b	Society	1989	22 June 1997	
120	4	Exotica	1994	29 June 1997	
121a	5a	Blue Collar	1978	13 July 1997	
121b	5b	American Gigolo	1980	13 July 1997	
122a	6a	Dazed and Confused	1993	20 July 1997	
122b	6b	The Sex Lives of the Belgians	1994	20 July 1997	
123a	7a	The Girl Can't Help It	1956	27 July 1997	
123b	7b	Take Care of Your Scarf, Tatjana	1994	27 July 1997	
124a	8a	The Warriors	1979	3 August 1997	
124b	8b	La Haine	1995	3 August 1997	
125	9	Spanking the Monkey	1994	10 August 1997	
126a	10a	Logan's Run	1976	17 August 1997	
126b	10b	Fahrenheit 451	1966	17 August 1997	

==== Series 9 (1998) ====
No. overall	No. in series	Film	Year	Broadcast date	Ref.
127a	1a	The Fog	1980	4 January 1998	
127b	1b	Darkness in Tallinn	1993	4 January 1998	
128a	2a	Storyville	1992	11 January 1998	
128b	2b	Ruthless	1948	11 January 1998	
129a	3a	Vanishing Point	1971	18 January 1998	
129b	3b	The Devil Thumbs a Ride	1947	18 January 1998	
130	4	Targets	1968	1 February 1998	
131	5	Liebestraum	1991	8 February 1998	
132	6	Bad Timing	1980	15 February 1998	
133	7	The Conversation	1974	22 February 1998	
134a	8a	All That Heaven Allows	1955	1 March 1998	
134b	8b	The Reckless Moment	1949	1 March 1998	
135	9	Highway Patrolman	1991	8 March 1998	

==== Series 10 (1998) ====
No. overall	No. in series	Film	Year	Broadcast date	Ref.
136	1	Trespass	1992	20 September 1998	
137a	2a	Shaft	1971	27 September 1998	
137b	2b	Force of Evil	1948	27 September 1998	
138	3	Funny Bones	1995	4 October 1998	
139	4	Cat People	1982	11 October 1998	
140	5	The Killers	1946	18 October 1998	
141	6	Caged Heat	1974	25 October 1998	
142	7	Thunderbolt and Lightfoot	1974	1 November 1998	
143	8	Carrie (Note: Although Carrie was broadcast on Moviedrome before, this screening included an exclusive interview from Brian De Palma.)	1976	8 November 1998	
144a	9a	Leon	1994	15 November 1998	
144b	9b	Le Samouraï	1967	15 November 1998	

==== Series 11 (1999) ====
No. overall	No. in series	Film	Year	Broadcast date	Ref.
145	1	Clockers	1995	18 April 1999	
146a	2a	Ed Wood	1995	25 April 1999	
146b	2b	The Body Snatcher	1945	25 April 1999	
147	3	Prêt-à-Porter	1994	2 May 1999	
148a	4a	Videodrome	1983	9 May 1999	
148b	4b	Kiss Tomorrow Goodbye	1950	9 May 1999	
149	5	Carlito's Way	1993	16 May 1999	
150	6	The Osterman Weekend	1983	23 May 1999	
151	7	Mommie Dearest	1981	6 June 1999	
152	8	Johnny Guitar	1954	11 June 1999	
153	9	Branded to Kill	1967	18 June 1999	
154	10	The List of Adrian Messenger	1963	20 June 1999	
155	11	One-Eyed Jacks	1961	11 July 1999	

==== Series 12 (2000) ====
No. overall	No. in series	Film	Year	Broadcast date	Ref.
156a	1a	Blood and Wine	1996	14 May 2000	
156b	1b	Plein Soleil	1960	14 May 2000	
157a	2a	Rumble in the Bronx	1995	21 May 2000	
157b	2b	Clubbed to Death	1997	21 May 2000	
158a	3a	The Underneath	1995	4 June 2000	
158b	3b	The Hitch-Hiker	1953	4 June 2000	
159a	4a	The Killers	1964	11 June 2000	
159b	4b	On Dangerous Ground	1951	11 June 2000	
160a	5a	Walkabout	1971	18 June 2000	
160b	5b	Don't Look Now	1973	18 June 2000	
161	6	White of the Eye	1987	2 July 2000	
162	7	The Last American Hero	1973	9 July 2000	

Note: Although some episodes (including both singular, and the second film of the double bill episodes) were broadcast after 12:00am and into the early hours of Monday mornings, they will remain dated for the Sunday night broadcast schedules to avoid confusion.
