= Ruined Heart! Another Love Story Between a Criminal and a Whore =

- Directed by: Khavn
- Written by: Khavn
- Produced by: Khavn; Fe Virtudazo-Hyde; Achinette Villamor
- Starring: Ian Lomongo; Cara Eriguel
- Cinematography: Albert Banzon
- Edited by: Lawrence S. Ang
- Music by: Arvie Bartolome; Fando & Lis; Angus Lorenzo; Steven Chua
- Production company: Kamias Road
- Release date: February 11, 2012 (Berlinale)
- Running time: 15 minutes
- Country: Philippines
- Language: Tagalog

Ruined Heart! Another Love Story Between a Criminal and a Whore is a 2012 Filipino short film written and directed by independent filmmaker Khavn De La Cruz. It is the first Philippine entry to be officially selected in the International Competition of the short film section of the Berlin International Film Festival. It competed at the 62nd Berlin International Film Festival.

The film's original title is in Tagalog: Pusong Wazak! Isa Na Namang Kwento Ng Pag-ibig Sa Pagitan Ng Isang Kriminal At Isang Puta. At the 62nd Berlin International Film Festival, however, it was given the German title Zerstörtes Herz!.

Ruined Heart! is the classic love story between a gangster and a prostitute, but Khavn "deconstructs this often recounted tale to explore in fleeting images the likelihood of dying too early from the violence so omnipresent in the Philippines today".

== Synopsis ==
In the criminal underworld of Manila, a prominent crime boss rules with an iron hand. He has entrusted his girlfriend to his stubborn henchman to look after her. However, the henchman and the woman falls in love and decides to leave the city. While on the run, the two lovers has finally gotten the chance to get to know each other for the first time.

== Production ==
Ruined Heart! was filmed in 24 hours, in six different places in Metro Manila. The main location was the filmmaker's residence in Kamias Road. Other locations include the walled city, Intramuros; a bar in Marikina; a rooftop near Roxas Boulevard; a slum in Cambridge Street; and a vacant lot in Quezon City.

Khavn, considered the father of digital filmmaking in the Philippines, is well known for his guerilla tactics: he shoots very fast with a very small crew. He explains that while more demanding on himself and on his crew, this shooting style is both practical and efficient because:

The longer it takes to make a film, the more expensive it is so I keep my shoots short and sweet. It has to do with energy, too. Like improvisational music played on the piano: you have this moment to create something right then and there, you just follow the beat. It’s the idea of “best thought, first thought.” The best take is the first take. All the “mistakes” ultimately become part of the piece, the set design. You allow the world into your films.

== Awards ==
Year	Film Festival/Award	Result	Category/Recipient
2012	Golden Bear, Berlin International Film Festival	Nominated	Best Short Film
