= Willow and Wind =

- Directed by: Mohammad-Ali Talebi
- Written by: Abbas Kiarostami
- Produced by: Mohammad Mehdi Dadgo; Makoto Ueda
- Starring: Hadi Alipour; Amir Janfada; Majid Alipour; Mohammad Sharif Ebrahimi
- Cinematography: Farhad Saba
- Release date: 2000
- Running time: 77 minutes
- Countries: Iran; Japan
- Language: Persian

Willow and Wind (Persian: بید و باد, romanized: Bid o bad) is a 2000 Iranian drama film directed by Mohammad-Ali Talebi and written by Abbas Kiarostami.

== Plot ==
During a football game, a piece of window glass is smashed in an Iranian school. The boy responsible for the incident, Kuchakpourso, is told that he should replace the glass or he will be expelled from the school. Kuchakpourso is helped by his friend Razam, a new boy in the school, who persuades his parents to pay for the glass. However, Kuchakpourso had been ordered to carry the piece of glass to the school alone. The weather was bitter and the wind so strong that he almost failed on the road. He tried hard and finally moved the load back to the classroom where he was supposed to fix the broken window. He was alone again with no one to turn to for help. in the end, the glass was crushed to pieces by the wind.

== Reception ==
In Iran, the movie has been acclaimed as evidence that, after fifteen years of efforts by Talebi and others, Iranian cinema gradually became capable to produce meaningful movies about teenagers, intended for both a juvenile and an adult audience.

In the West, the movie was also seen as a metaphor of contemporary Iran. According to one critic, "as the film moves towards its nervy conclusion, it’s clear that the fraught political climate and growing censorship in Iran is Kuchakpourso’s true obstacle, with the fragility of the glass representative of the hopes and dreams of an entire generation."

Peter Bradshaw found the movie difficult to understand outside Iran, yet he conceded that it has "its own trance-like logic and conveys a child's loneliness, vulnerability, fear of abandonment, and fear of being out of one's depth. It is a difficult prose-poem of a film, utterly unique."

== See also ==
- List of Iranian films
