= Skarga (film) =

- Directed by: Jerzy Wójcik
- Written by: Jerzy Wójcik; Witold Zalewski
- Starring: Magda Teresa Wójcik; Henryk Boukołowski; Danuta Szaflarska; Rafał Zwierz; Karolina Lutczyn
- Cinematography: Bogdan Sölle
- Edited by: Mirosława Garlicka
- Music by: Stanisław Syrewicz
- Production companies: Studio Filmowe Indeks; Telewizja Polska
- Distributed by: Telewizja Polska
- Release date: 18 December 1991
- Running time: 84 minutes
- Country: Poland
- Language: Polish

Skarga (Polish: [ˈskar.ɡa]; lit. 'The Complaint') is a 1991 Polish-language political film directed by Jerzy Wójcik and written by Wójcik and Witold Zalewski. It premiered on 18 December 1991. It was based on the history of the family of Stefan Stawicki, a 16-year-old student, who was killed on 18 December 1970, by a stray bullet, shot during the brutal pacification of the protests in Szczecin, Poland.

== Plot ==
On 18 December 1970, in Szczecin, Poland, workers of the Szczecin Shipyard protest the sudden increase in the prices of food and other everyday items. The government forces attempted to brutally pacify the protests and open fire at the protesters. A stray bullet kills Stefan Stawicki, a 16-year-old student who walked by. The government refuses to let his parents hold a funeral, afraid that it will start further protests and riots.

== Cast ==
- Rafał Zwierz as Stefan Stawicki
- Danuta Szaflarska as Stefan's grandmother
- Henryk Boukołowski as Stanisław Stawicki, Stefan's father
- Magda Teresa Wójcik as Stefania Stawicka, Stefan's mother
- Marek Frąckowiak as the Security Service member, and the organization of Stefan's funeral
- Piotr Krukowski as a man in a burning building
- Stanisław Michalski as a man in a burning building
- Karolina Lutczyn as Ania, Stefan's girlfriend
- Mirosława Marcheluk as clerk, Stefania's friend
- Andrzej Głoskowski as Kowalczyk, father of killed girls

== Production ==
Skarga was based on the history of the family of Stefan Stawicki, a 16-year-old student, who was killed on 18 December 1970, by a stray bullet, shot during the brutal pacification of the protests in Szczecin, Poland.

The film was directed by Jerzy Wójcik and written by Wójcik and Witold Zalewski. The cinematography was done by Witold Sobociński, scenography by Bogdan Sölle, editing by Mirosława Garlicka, and music by Stanisław Syrewicz. The main cast included: Magda Teresa Wójcik, Henryk Boukołowski, Danuta Szaflarska, Rafał Zwierz, and Karolina Lutczyn. The film was produced by Studio Filmowe Indeks and Telewizja Polska. It was filmed in Szczecin, Poland, in Szczecin Shipyard, Voivodeship Police Headquarters on 47 Małopolska Street, on Wojska Polskiego Avenue, Mariacka Street, and Kaszubska Street.

It premiered on 18 December 1991, on the 21st anniversary of the death of Stefan Stawicki.
