= Dorota Kędzierzawska =

Polish film director (born 1957)

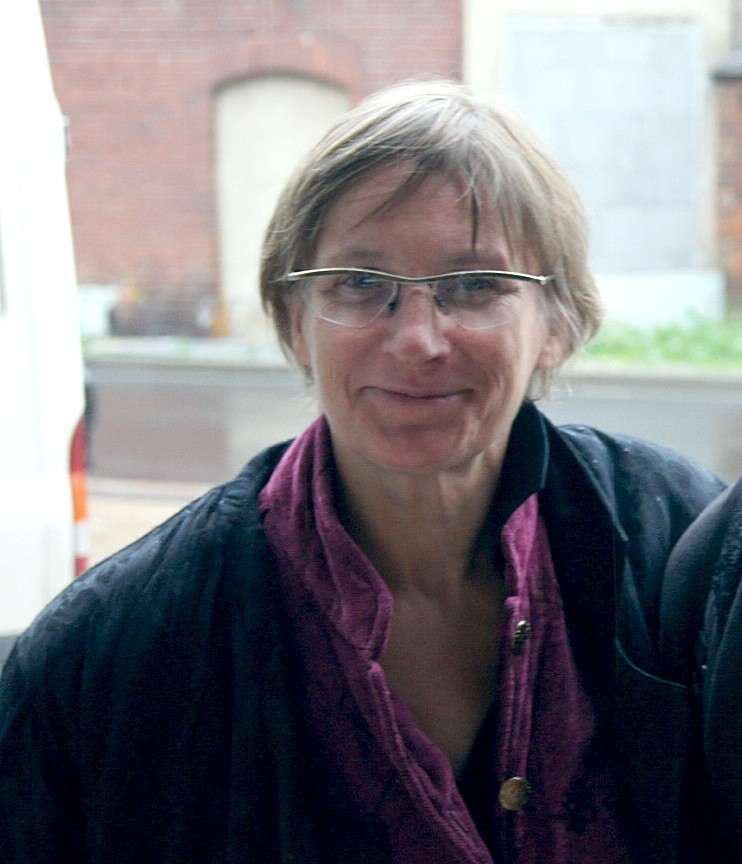
- Born: 1 June 1957 (age 69); Łódź
- Education: National Film School in Łódź
- Occupations: Director, editor, screenwriter
- Notable work: Nic, Pora umierać, Jutro będzie lepiej, Jestem

Dorota Kędzierzawska (Polish pronunciation: [dɔˈrɔta kɛɲd͡ʑɛˈʐafska]; born 1 June 1957) is a Polish director of feature and documentary films.

== Biography ==
Kędzierzawska was born in Łódź. She graduated from the National Film School in Łódź in 1981 but prior to that had completed a course in cultural studies at the University of Łódź and studied film directing in Moscow for two years.

Kędzierzawska directed several films, including Crows, Nothing, I Am, and Devils, Devils. In her films she concentrates on the experiences of disadvantaged children who contend with a difficult financial situation, rejection by adults, or both. Her characters are usually women, hopelessly fighting for the love of their men. Her film, Time to Die (Pora Umierać, 2007), is a ful black-and-white depiction of the daily life of an old woman named Aniela, played by Danuta Szaflarska.

== Filmography ==
Dorota Kędzierzawska directed the following movies:

- Agnieszka (1980, Short film)
- Jajko (1982, Short film)
- Początek (1983, Short documentary)
- Gucia (1985, Short film)
- Koniec Świata (1998, TV Movie)
- Diabły, diabły (1991, screened for the 30th International Critics' Week of Cannes)
- Wrony (1994, aka Crows)
- Nic (1998)
- I Am (2005)
- Time to Die (2007)
- Tomorrow Will Be Better (2011)
- Another World (2012)
- Żużel (2020)
- Sny pełne dymu (2023)
