= Time to Die (2007 film) =

2007 Polish film

- Directed by: Dorota Kędzierzawska
- Written by: Dorota Kędzierzawska
- Produced by: Arthur Reinhart; Piotr Miklaszewski; Wojciech Maryański
- Starring: Danuta Szaflarska; Krzysztof Globisz
- Cinematography: Arthur Reinhart
- Edited by: Arthur Reinhart; Dorota Kędzierzawska
- Music by: Włodek Pawlik
- Production companies: Tandem Taren-To; Kid Film; Telewizja Polska
- Distributed by: Gutek Film
- Release date: October 19, 2007 (Poland)
- Running time: 104 minutes
- Country: Poland
- Language: Polish
- Budget: 1,690,980 PLN

Time to Die (Pora umierać) is a Polish black-and-white drama film from 2007, directed and written by Dorota Kędzierzawska. The protagonist of the film is the elderly Aniela (played by Danuta Szaflarska), who lives with her dog in an abandoned wooden villa in Warsaw. The film was produced with the support of the Polish Film Institute and features digital cinematography by Arthur Reinhart. Pora umierać achieved significant success at various festivals, winning awards for sound design and Szaflarska's performance at the Polish Film Festival, as well as earning Szaflarska a Polish Academy Award for Best Actress at the Polish Film Awards. The film also garnered numerous accolades at international film festivals. In critical analyses, attention was drawn to Kędzierzawska's subtle exploration of themes such as dying, attitudes toward death, and coexistence with non-human organisms.

== Plot ==
The film's protagonist, the elderly Aniela, lives with her dog Fila in a pre-war, crumbling wooden villa in Warsaw. After years of sharing her home with various tenants, she finally manages to get rid of the last one. However, her son Witek, who occasionally visits with his wife Marzenka and their overweight daughter, has no intention of living in her family home. Moreover, Aniela is harassed by emissaries sent by her neighbor, who plans to acquire her property and demolish the villa.

Aniela is deeply attached to the house, where she spent her youth, and it holds many memories and keepsakes. She hopes her son will resist the pressure from the neighbor. However, she discovers that Witek has secretly visited the villa with the neighbor's wife and is negotiating the sale of the property. Betrayed by her son, Aniela decides to die. She cancels her son's visits, drapes the mirrors in black, stops the old clock, dons a black dress, lights a candle, and lies down with a rosary in hand, awaiting death. Soon after, though, Aniela rethinks her decision. She decides to change the fate of the house by donating it for public use, while keeping the right to live out her final days there. The villa quickly fills with young tenants. One day, a child notices that Aniela has vanished from her chair. The camera "flies" out through the window, showing the house from a distance.

== Cast ==
- Danuta Szaflarska as Aniela Walter
- Krzysztof Globisz as Witek Walter
- Patrycja Szewczyk as Aniela's granddaughter
- Kamil Bitau as Romek Fiodor "Dostoyevsky"
- Robert Tomaszewski as the intruder
- Agnieszka Podsiadlik as Agnieszka Kozłowska, a teacher at the center
- Piotr Ziarkiewicz as the director of the center
- Małgorzata Rożniatowska as the doctor
- Marta Waldera as Aniela's daughter-in-law
- Joanna Szarkowska as young Aniela
- Witold Kaczanowski as notary Adam Koniecpolski
- Wit Kaczanowski Jr. as Aniela's son in his youth
- Weronika Karwowska as Aniela's neighbor
- Kai Schoenhals as Aniela's neighbor
- Sylwia Bocheńska as the girl with tea
- Róża Salamonowicz as the tenant's daughter
- Remigiusz Przełożny as Aniela's fiancé
- Leszek Musiał as a man from the municipality
- Adam Karczewski as a man from the municipality

== Production ==
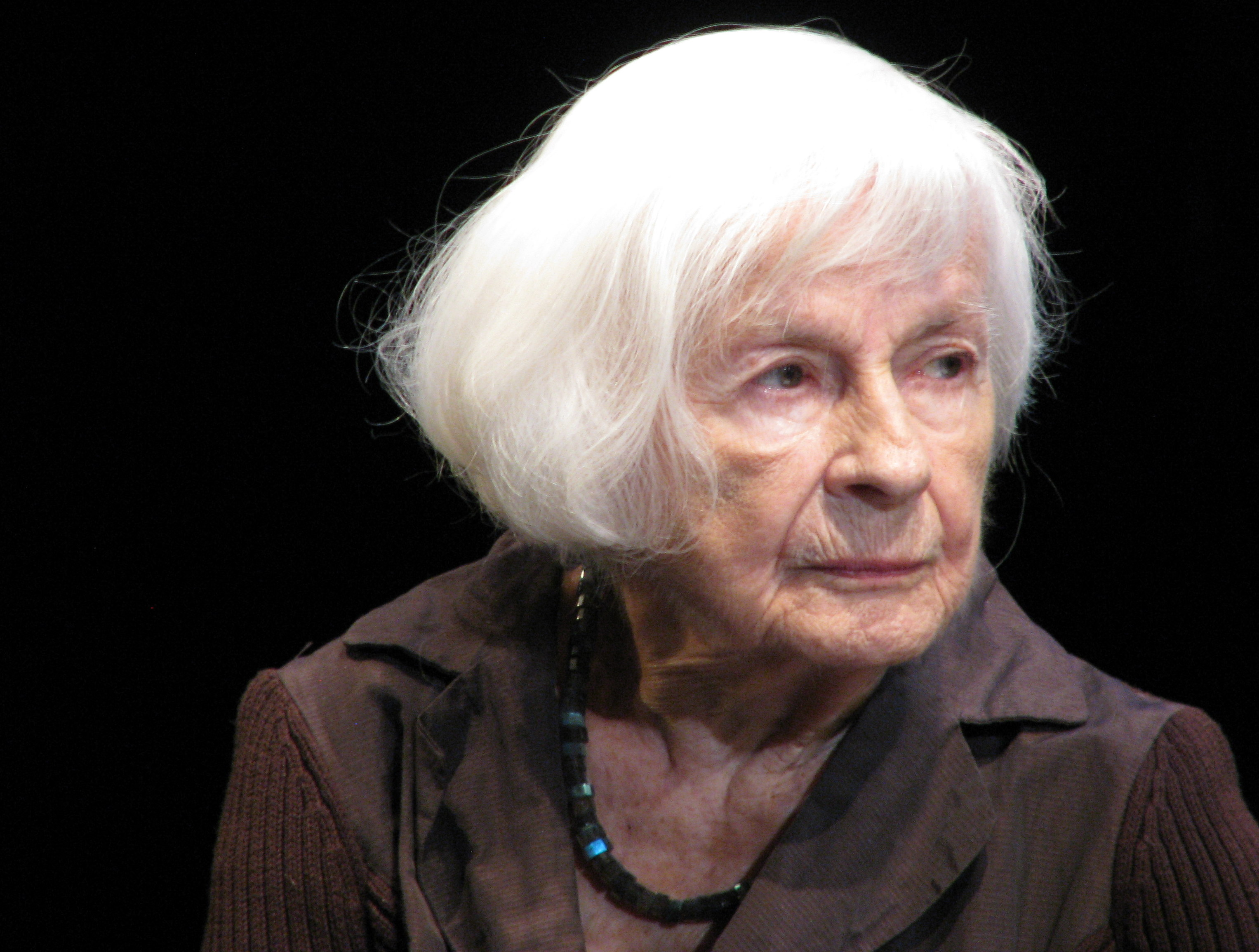
Danuta Szaflarska, the actress portraying Aniela (2013)

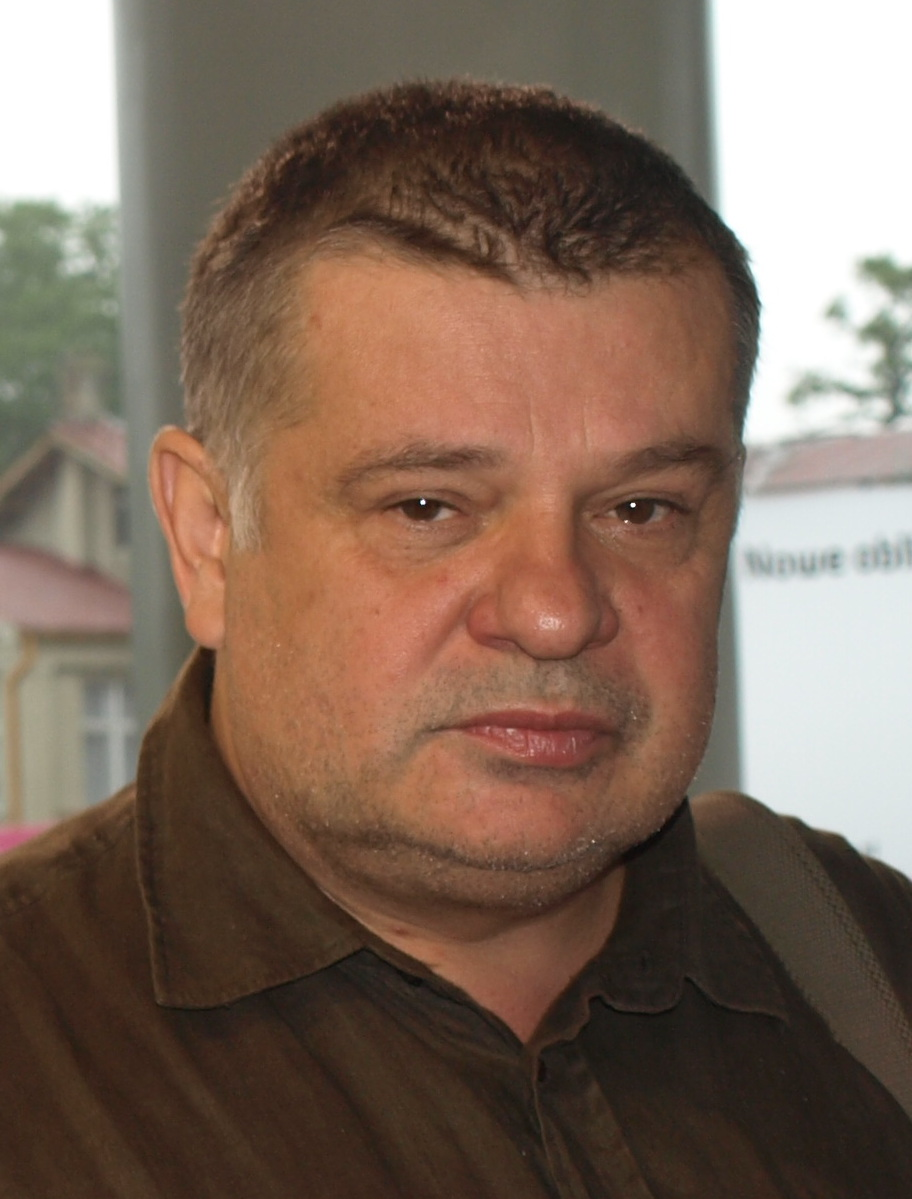
Krzysztof Globisz, the actor portraying Witek (2012)

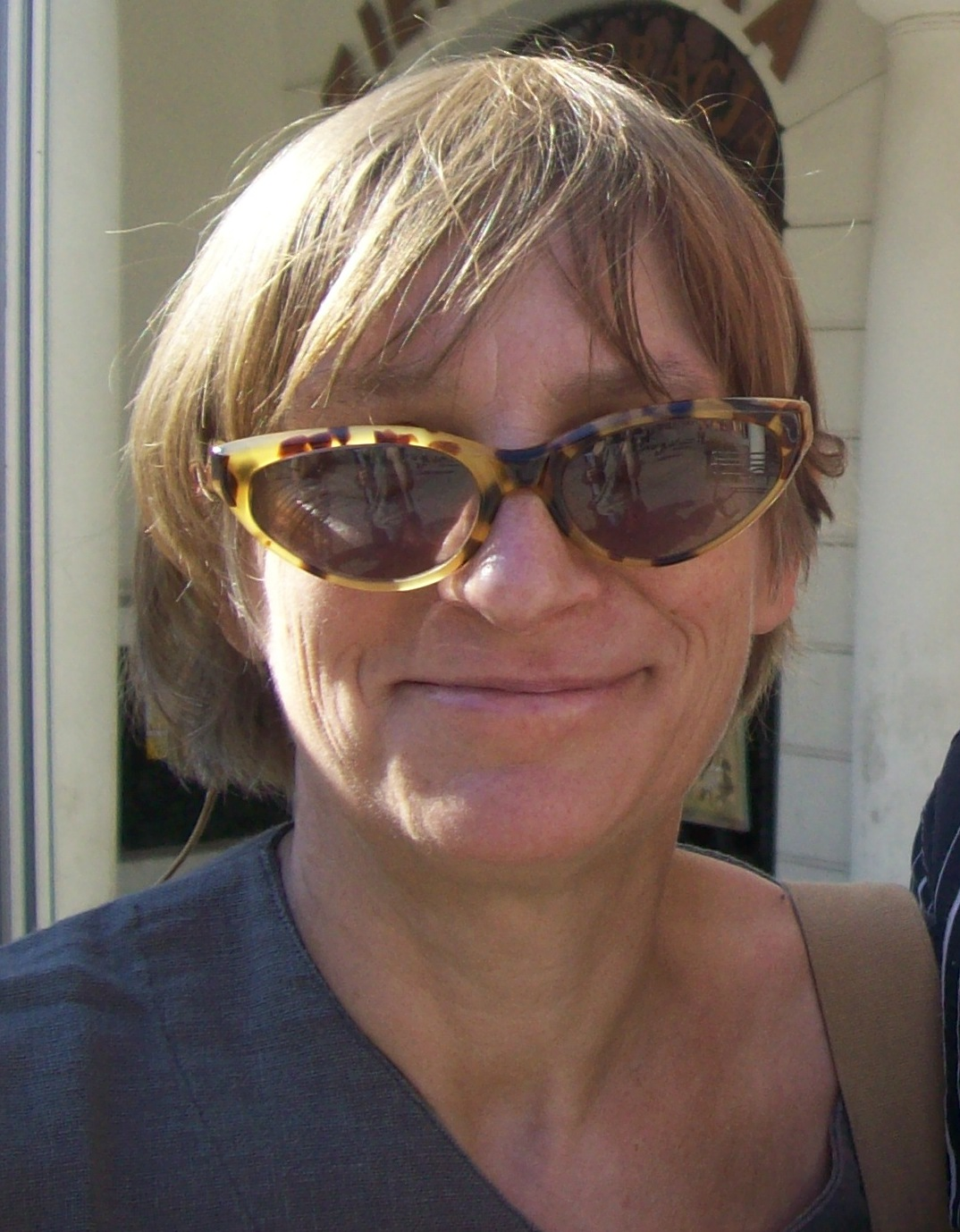
Dorota Kędzierzawska, the film's director (2011)

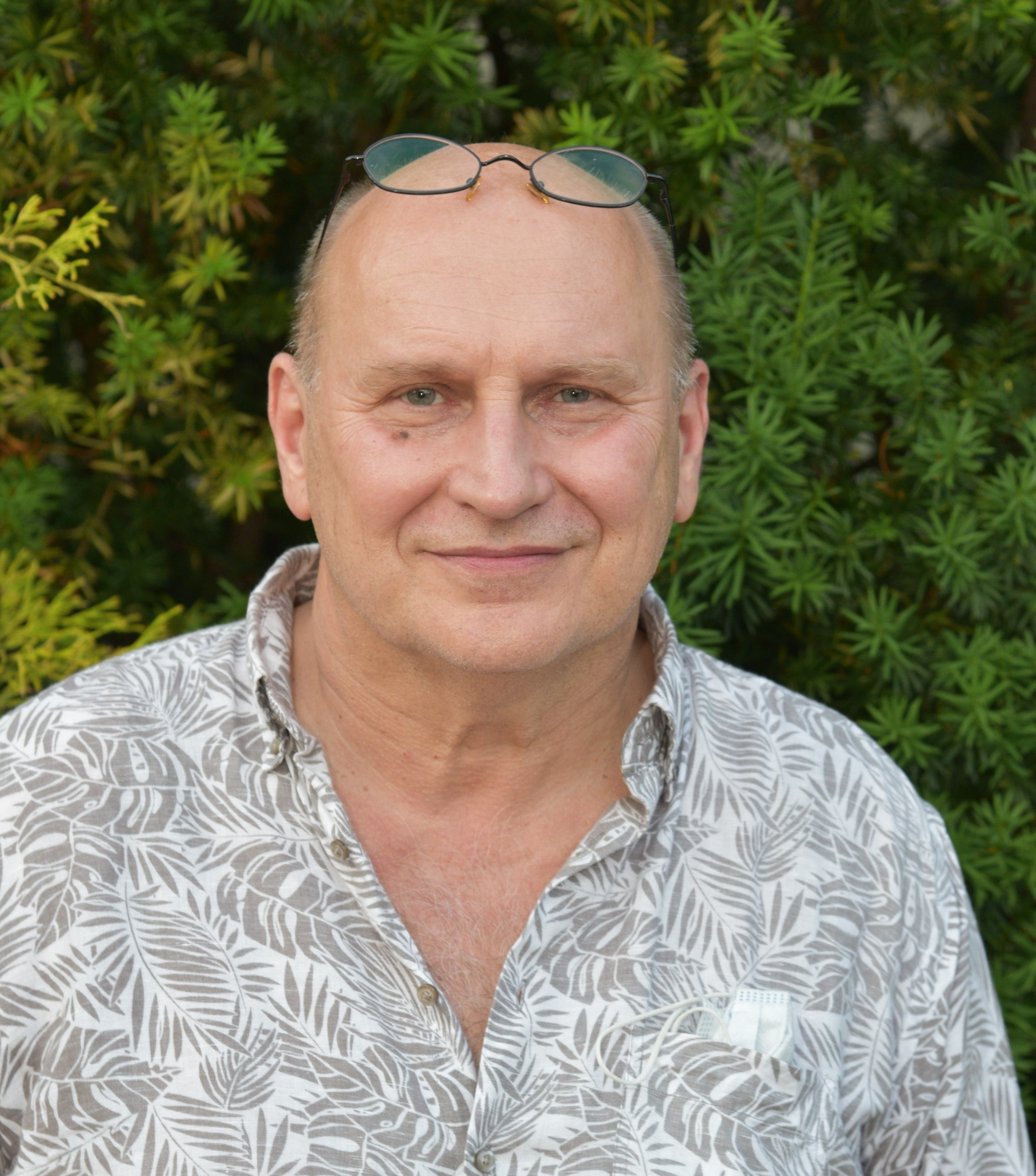
Włodek Pawlik, the composer of the film's music (2021)

The production of Pora umierać was handled by Kid Film and Tandem Taren-To, with support from the Polish Film Institute. The total budget for the film amounted to 1,690,980 PLN.

=== Preparation and cast ===
Director Dorota Kędzierzawska wrote the script specifically with Danuta Szaflarska in mind, who had also appeared in other films directed by Kędzierzawska (Diabły, diabły, 1991; Nic, 1998). In an interview, Kędzierzawska revealed that she had been waiting for Szaflarska to play the role of Aniela for 16 years: "She often hurried me, saying: 'Dorotka, write faster, or I'll drop dead on you'". The film also featured Krzysztof Globisz, Małgorzata Rożniatowska, Agnieszka Podsiadlik, Marta Waldera, as well as non-professional actors. The production process was risky, as filming began with almost no budget. Fortunately, the film crew received funding from the Polish Film Institute during the first week of filming, and six months later, television joined the project. A special role was given to the protagonist's dog, selected through a casting process. Describing the dog's work, Kędzierzawska said: "He had intelligent eyes and loved his trainer so much that they were always communicating. He learned to open doors in fifteen minutes, and how to answer the phone in ten. He was always ready to work. [...] He was truly a phenomenon".

=== Cinematography ===
The cinematography for Pora umierać was handled by Kędzierzawska's partner, Arthur Reinhart, who shot the film in black and white. The choice of monochrome was a deliberate decision by Kędzierzawska, who argued that "in black contrasted with white, there is purity and nobility". The film was shot from May 16 to 26 June 2006 in Otwock. The film's score was composed by Włodek Pawlik, whose soundtrack was released in 2011 by the Polish Radio. Describing the score, Krzysztof Kowalewicz from Gazeta Wyborcza said: "This time, Pawlik uses a modest instrumentation, and sparingly employs sounds. The nostalgic piano theme is so drawn out that the listener is left anticipating the next key press [...] Strings, a trumpet, and above all, a harp, complement Pawlik's piano".

=== Distribution ===
On 12 and 13 September 2007, Pora umierać was screened at the Toronto International Film Festival, where it was met with a standing ovation from the audience. The film premiered in Polish cinemas on 19 October 2007. Kędzierzawska's film was particularly successful in Japan, where it premiered in 2011, mainly attracting older women.

In 2008, Best Film company released Pora umierać on DVD.

== Reception ==
=== Box office attendance ===
According to statistics from the Polish Film Institute, Pora umierać was seen by 54,076 viewers in theaters, ranking it 12th among the most-watched Polish films in 2007.

=== Critical reception ===
Pora umierać was an artistic success for Kędzierzawska, although the film mainly attracted critics' attention due to Danuta Szaflarska's performance. Zdzisław Pietrasik from Polityka wrote: "We should commend Dorota Kędzierzawska and the cinematographer Arthur Reinhart, but Pora umierać is primarily a showcase for Danuta Szaflarska's acting". Marek Sadowski in his review for Rzeczpospolita noted that Aniela's character "does not embody senile passivity. She knows what she wants. When she finds something appropriate, she acts decisively and consistently". Łukasz Maciejewski in his review for Dziennik Polski praised Szaflarska's performance, calling her "a great lady of Polish cinema" and appreciating her unconventional portrayal: "Aniela is nothing like the good grandmother from children's cartoons. She doesn't knit and doesn't listen to Radio Maryja. She has tucked her mohair beret deep in the bottom of the wardrobe; she is too curious about people and the world to believe in any dogmas". Jerzy Płażewski from Kino also lauded Szaflarska's acting: "Thank you, Ms. Danuta, for the sum of experiences that – as in the final traveling shot towards the sky, brilliantly arranged by cinematographer Arthur Reinhart – lead us, the viewers, far beyond earthly horizons".

However, not all reviews were positive. Jacek Szczerba from Gazeta Wyborcza found the film "average" and accused the Kędzierzawska–Reinhart duo of sterile aestheticism: "At times, the creators indulge in the beauty of their images: the fluidity of contours in memory scenes and the collage of reflections in panes of glass".

Overall, however, positive voices prevailed. Błażej Hrapkowicz from Kino wrote:

There are few films in our cinema that address difficult issues in such an accessible yet wise way, uplifting everyday life, recounting it without philosophical pomp and sentimentality, yet also without excessive distance. Above all, there are few optimistic and uplifting films that do not fall into naivety. Dorota Kędzierzawska's film fills this gap.

Pora umierać also found success abroad. Alissa Simon from Variety wrote about Szaflarska, describing her as "an actress of intelligence, charm, and beauty, who looks at least two decades younger, supported by the wonderfully baroque, detailed work of Reinhart's camera and the best-trained, most photogenic dog in Polish cinema". According to The Hollywood Reporter, Szaflarska and her dog Tokaj "create a wonderful odd couple in beautiful monochromatic images, skillfully photographed thanks to the high-quality digital cinematography of Arthur Reinhart, wandering through what was once a magnificent, now half-destroyed residence".

=== Analysis and interpretations ===
Daria Mazur positively evaluated the film, seeing it as a cinematic equivalent of a monodrama, asserting that "through a plastically refined, ambiguous, mysterious, and consciously constructed film portrait of an elderly tenant of a stylish villa, the director successfully narrates the experience of female aging". Mazur also noted that Kędzierzawska's film stands out in Polish cinema, where "it is difficult to find a comparable, equally consistent image based on female experiences, focused on a feminine perspective". Małgorzata Masłowska-Taffel observed that entrusting the main role to Danuta Szaflarska, who experienced the trauma of World War II and the violent social changes throughout her life, was crucial to the film's message: "Difficult experiences did not extinguish her spirit, nor did they take away her enjoyment of life". Iwona Grodź and Robert Stefanowski noted that Aniela's villa is an unreal space, on the border between the city and the province; "it becomes for her a place of memories, expectations, joy and sorrow, hope and death".

Małgorzata Radkiewicz interpreted Kędzierzawska's film through the lens of posthumanist philosophy. According to Radkiewicz, "individual objects and fragments of wooden architecture – the veranda, stairs, railings – come together to create a living story, simultaneously human and non-human". Radkiewicz added that "the woman coexists in the deserted villa on equal terms with the dog and the collected belongings", and when the house is handed over for social purposes, "it is in a sense liberated from the dominant humanistic narrative".

== Awards ==
Year	Institution	Award	Recipient
2007	32nd Polish Film Festival	Best Sound	Marcin Kasiński, Kacper Habisiak, Michał Pajdiak
2007	32nd Polish Film Festival	Best Actress	Danuta Szaflarska
2007	32nd Polish Film Festival	Journalists' Award	Dorota Kędzierzawska
2007	32nd Polish Film Festival	Golden Clapper for the most applauded film	Dorota Kędzierzawska
2007	32nd Polish Film Festival	Award from the President of Telewizja Polska	Dorota Kędzierzawska
2007	Optimistic Film Festival "Multimedia Happy End"	Grand Prix "Golden Fish"	Dorota Kędzierzawska
2008	Trieste International Film Festival	Special Mention	Dorota Kędzierzawska
2008	Trieste International Film Festival	Audience Award	Dorota Kędzierzawska
2008	Polish Film Academy	Eagle for Best Actress	Danuta Szaflarska
2008	"Prowincjonalia" National Film Art Festival	"Jańcio Wodnik" for Best Actress	Danuta Szaflarska
2008	San Francisco International Film Festival	Chris Holter Award for Humor in Film	Dorota Kędzierzawska
2008	The New York Polish Film Festival	Special Award	Dorota Kędzierzawska
2008	Film Directors Festival in Świdnica	Wojciech Jerzy Has Award	Dorota Kędzierzawska
2008	Tarnów Film Awards	Grand Prix	Dorota Kędzierzawska
2008	Film magazine	Golden Duck for Best Actress	Danuta Szaflarska
2008	Leeds International Film Festival	Audience Award	Danuta Szaflarska
2009	International Female Film Festival	Main Award	Dorota Kędzierzawska
2009	International Female Film Festival	Audience Award	Danuta Szaflarska
2009	International Images Film Festival for Women	Best Cinematography	Arthur Reinhart

== Bibliography ==
- Mazur, D. (2017). "Portret starszej pani – „Pora umierać" Doroty Kędzierzawskiej" [Portrait of an Elderly Lady – "Time to Die" by Dorota Kędzierzawska]. In Posłuszna, J. (ed.). Starość kobiet w biegu życia. Konteksty psychologiczne, literackie i kulturowe [The Old Age of Women in the Course of Life: Psychological, Literary, and Cultural Contexts] (in Polish).
