= Skarga =

Skarga may refer to:

== People ==
- Barbara Skarga (1919–2009), Polish philosopher
- Piotr Skarga (1536–1612), Polish Jesuit

== Other uses ==
- Skarga (film), Polish film
- Sermon of Piotr Skarga, painting
