= Krzysztof Dowgiałło =

Polish politician (1938–2026)

Member of the Sejm
- In office 18 June 1989 – 25 November 1991

Personal details
- Born: 30 June 1938 Nowomalin, Poland (now Novomalyn, Ukraine)
- Died: 21 June 2026 (aged 87)
- Party: Democratic Union
- Education: Gdańsk University of Technology
- Occupation: Politician, architect, writer

Krzysztof Dowgiałło (30 June 1938 – 21 June 2026) was a Polish architect, writer and politician who served as member of the Sejm from 1989 to 1991.

== Early life and career ==
Dowgiałło graduated in 1962 from the Faculty of Architecture of the Gdańsk University of Technology. From 1963 he worked in the profession in Great Britain, France and Algeria, and from 1967 in Gdańsk. He was the author of the poem Ballada o Janku Wiśniewski (The Ballad of Janek Wiśniewski), influenced from his participation in the December events of 1970. In 1980 he co-founded Solidarity and sat on the board of the union's region. He was imprisoned for his opposition activities in 1981–1983, as well as in 1985. He was the editor-in-chief of the prison newspaper in Potulice. He was a distributor of church aid, a French teacher in the prison, and the leader of many prison protests. From 1989 to 1993, he held the position of Vice-President of the International Labour Organization. He also served as a member of the Contract Sejm on behalf of the Citizens' Committee, and served as deputy chairman of the Committee on Spatial Policy, Construction and Housing Policy. From 1990 to 2005 he belonged to the Civic Movement Democratic Action, the Democratic Union and the Union of Freedom. In 1990, 1994 and 1998 he was elected a councilor of the city of Sopot. In the parliamentary elections in 1991, 1993, 1997 and 2001, he unsuccessfully ran for the Sejm of the Republic of Poland.

== Personal life and death ==
Dowgiałło was married to Anna née Chodkiewicz (died 2023), with whom he had three sons (Marcin, Piotr and Wojciech) and a daughter (Maria). In 2007, he was awarded the Commander's Cross with the Star of the Order of Polish Polonia Restituta by President Lech Kaczyński.

Dowgiałło died on 21 June 2026, at the age of 87.
