= Kühlungsborn =

Town in Mecklenburg-Vorpommern, Germany

- Town
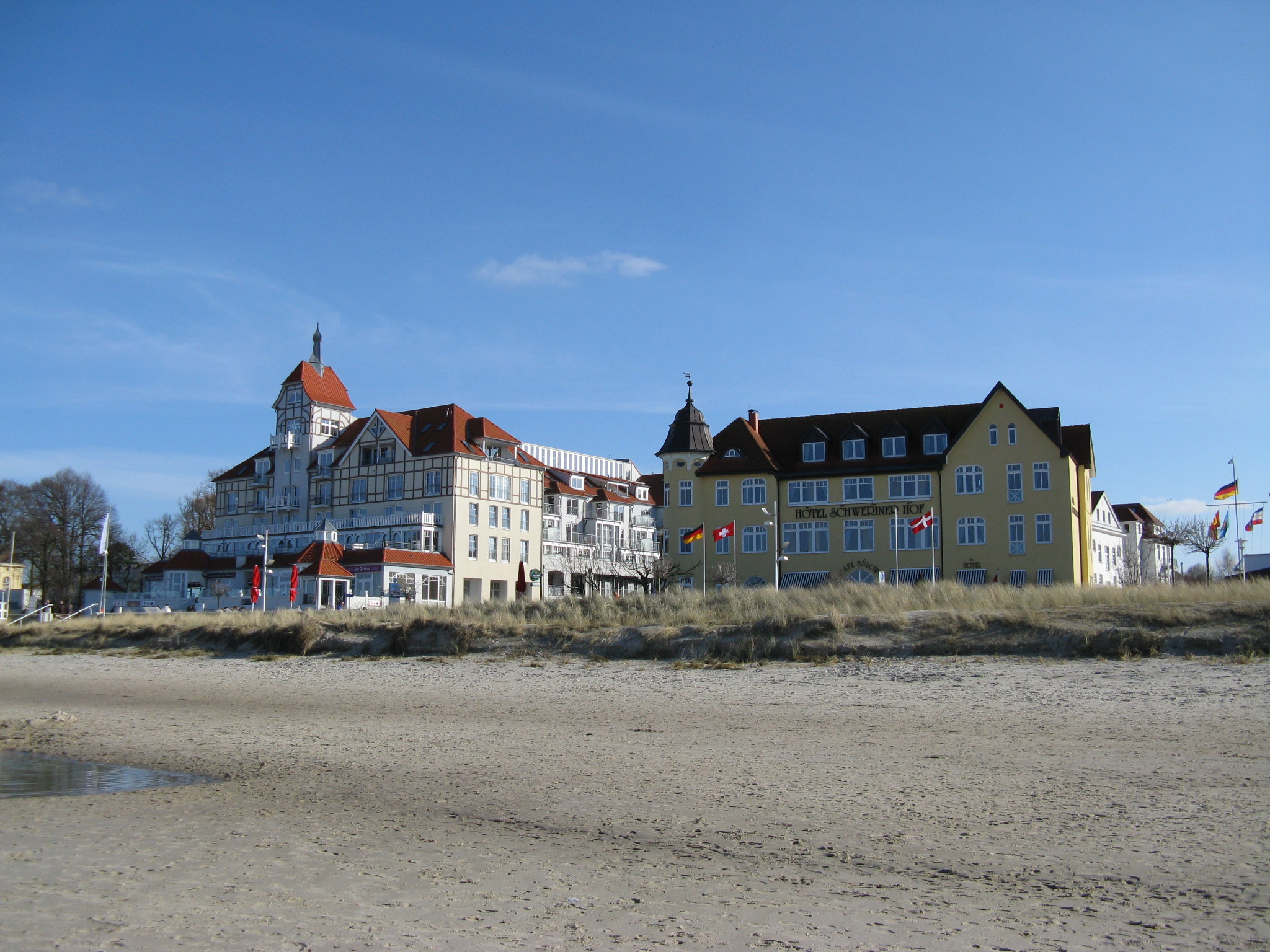
- Spa buildings at the beach showing local resort architecture

- Coat of arms

- Location of Kühlungsborn within Rostock district
- Interactive map of Kühlungsborn
- Location within Germany Location within Mecklenburg-Vorpommern
- Coordinates: 54°08′N 11°45′E
- Country: Germany
- State: Mecklenburg-Vorpommern
- District: Rostock

Government
  - Mayor: Rainer Karl (CDU)

Area
  - Total: 16.17 km^{2} (6.24 sq mi)
- Elevation: 10 m (33 ft)

Population (2025-12-31)
  - Total: 8,100
  - Density: 500/km^{2} (1,300/sq mi)
- Time zone: UTC+01:00 (CET)
  - Summer (DST): UTC+02:00 (CEST)
- Postal codes: 18225
- Dialling codes: 038293
- Vehicle registration: LRO
- Website: www.stadt-kuehlungsborn.de

Kühlungsborn (German pronunciation: [kyːlʊŋsˈbɔɐ̯n]) is a Seebad, an officially designated seaside resort town, in the Rostock district, in Mecklenburg-Vorpommern, Germany. It is situated on the Baltic Sea coast, 11 km northwest of Bad Doberan, and 25 km northwest of Rostock.

The town has an elongate beach and promenade, many hotels in typical German spa town architecture and a marina. It is the largest seaside spa town in Mecklenburg.

Kühlungsborn is a place with long spa traditions. It was one of the early seaside resorts to be founded in Germany, dating back to the 1860s. While the bicycle is a popular way of transport, the Molli steam railway is a historic tourist attraction that also allows exploration the area. In summer, many people rent of the traditional Strandkorb on the beach, a covered chair protecting one from wind and sun.

== Town history ==
The town of Kühlungsborn was founded on April 1, 1938 with the merger of the three municipalities; Fulgen, Brunshaupten and Arendsee. On the town coat of arms, three flying seagulls on a blue background represent these former municipalities.

At the end of World War II in 1945, many refugees settled temporarily or permanently in Kühlungsborn. In 1953, the East German government partially expropriated and arbitrarily nationalised a number of hotels and boarding houses in the city during the so-called "Action Rose". Over 50 of these institutions were transformed into holiday and health resorts for regulated holidays for East German citizens which were controlled by FDGB Trade Union. If the former owners resisted, they were often convicted in show trials. Many were forced into exile in West Germany.

During East Germany's standard holiday period of July to August, Kühlungsborn was packed with holidaymakers. The cost of the FDGB holiday facilities was low, normally 60-100 East German marks for 14 days full board. During this time, there were frequent shortages in commercial establishments. Annual festivals were conducted for three decades, during Baltic Week, usually the first week of July. There were numerous high-profile cultural events during these festivals. Participants from the Baltic Sea countries and Norway were accommodated in boarding houses.

From 1958 to 1990, approximately 100 men of the East German Navy's (Volksmarine) elite 18th Combat Swimmer Command (Kampfschwimmerkommando 18 (KSK-18)) were stationed in Kühlungsborn.

Since the mid-1990s, Kühlungsborn has become a popular year-round destination for the holiday season.

Kühlungsborn has no tall buildings because no house is allowed to be built higher than the tallest trees. After the reunification of Germany, the historic centre of Kühlungsborn was thoroughly renovated and many historic buildings restored. However, in 1994, 26 historic buildings, examples of resort architecture, were demolished as part of this renovation, such as the Arendseer Kurhaus completed in 1906. There are many new hotels and apartments as well as renovated old hotels and guest houses. From 2002 to 2004, the new marina was built in East Kühlungsborn with 400 moorings. The resort's pier was built in 1991, and the 3,200-metre-long beach promenade was completely renovated in 2007.

For the G8 summit in Heiligendamm in 2007, the press was accommodated in East Kühlungsborn. Around 5,390 journalists from 78 countries representing 1,045 media outlets were accredited and stayed mostly in Kühlungsborn.

== Sights ==
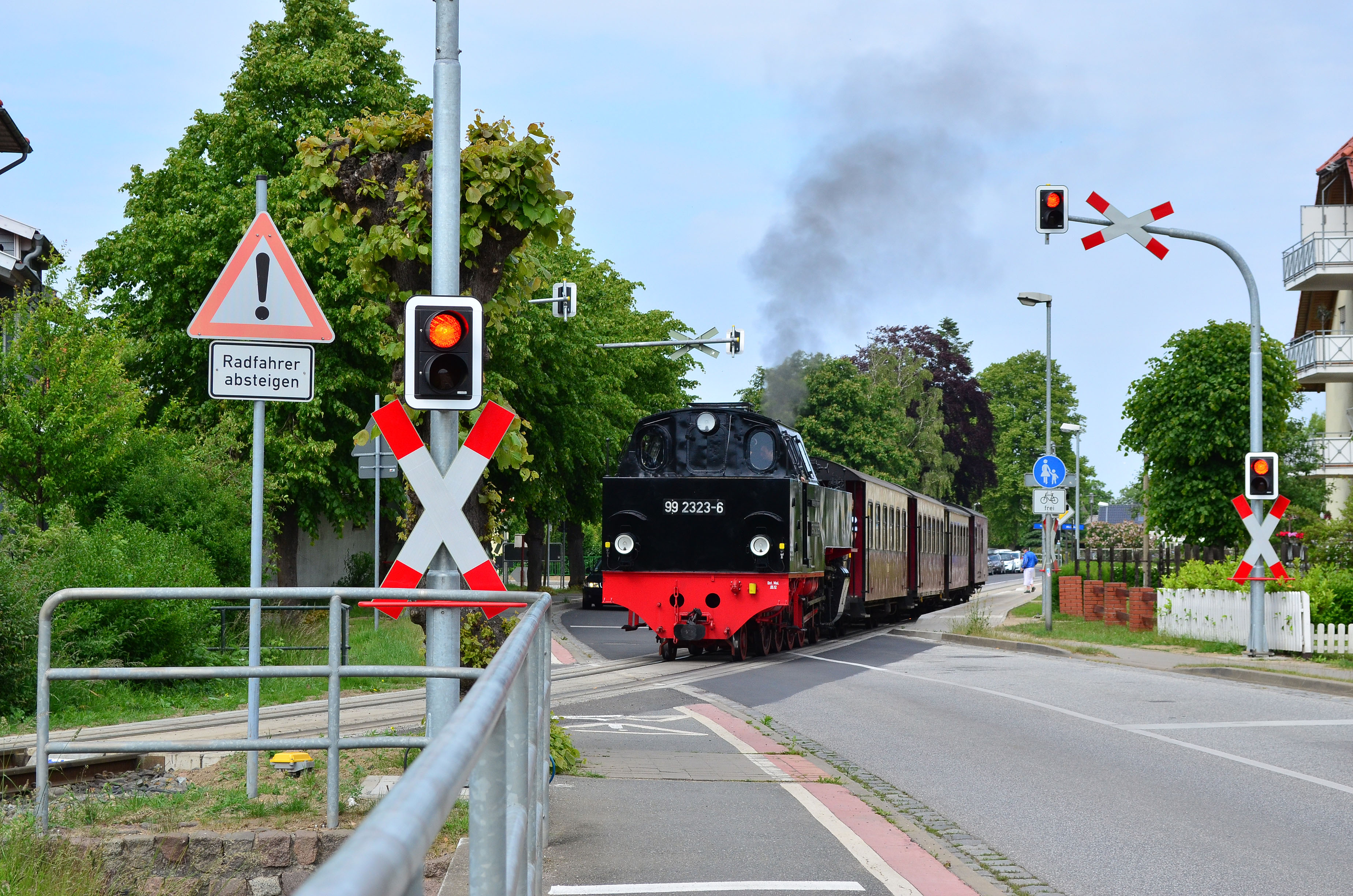
Bäderbahn Molli at the Mitte halt in Kühlungsborn

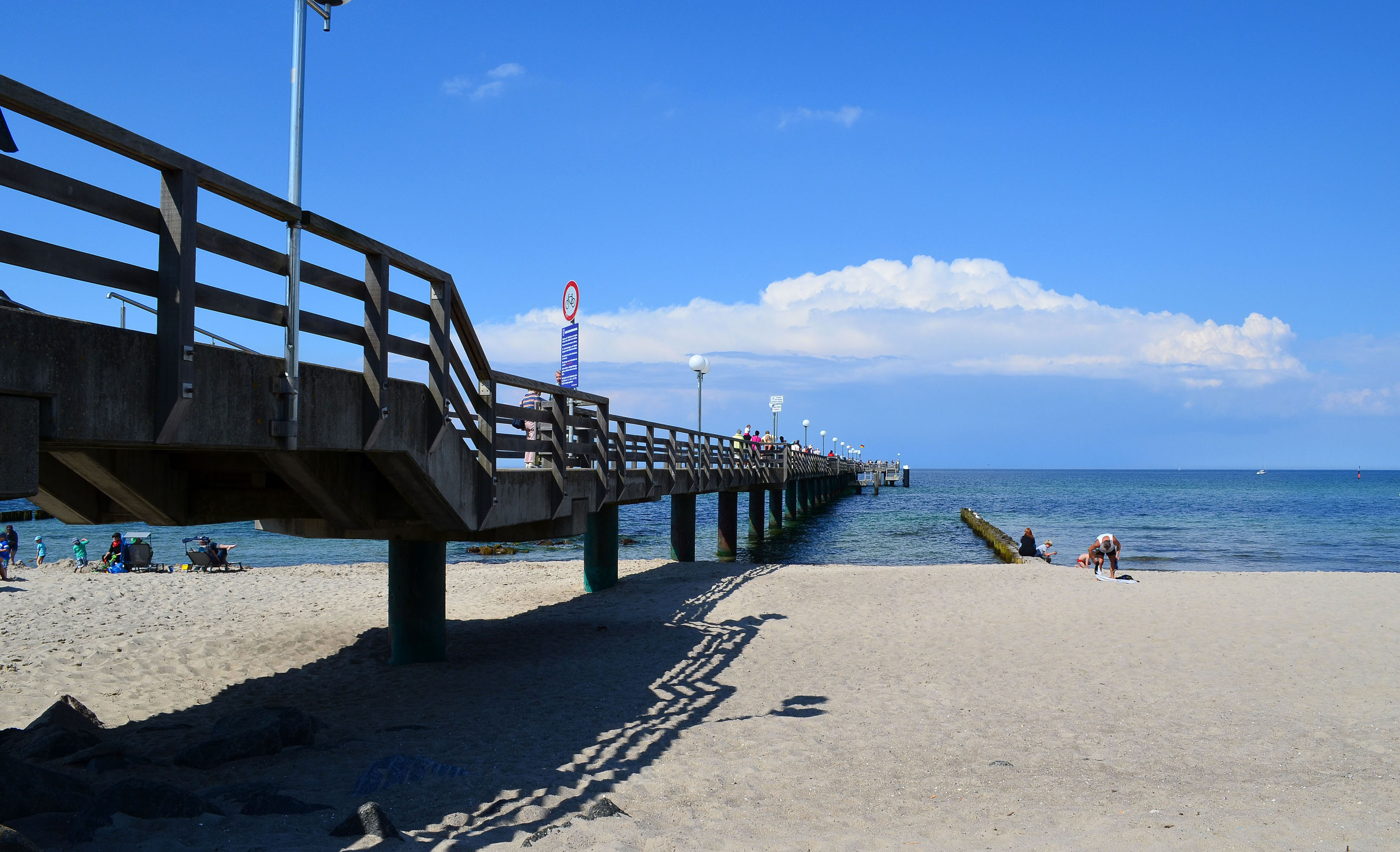
Pier

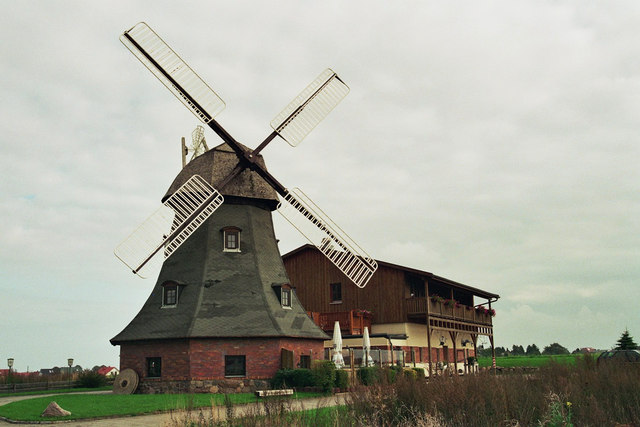
Brunshöven Mill

- Bäderbahn Molli, the local steam-operated narrow gauge railway. The line from Bad Doberan to Heiligendamm (then called Fürstenbad) was opened in 1886, its extension to Brunshaupten and Arendsee was completed in 1910, the reconstruction of the interior of the coaches was carried out in GDR times, with what was clearly modern wall materials for that period.
- The Kühlung, a densely wooded ridge with good views south of Kühlungsborn, was formed during the ice age as a push moraine.
- St. John's Church in Kühlungsborn-Ost. This Early Gothic church dates to the 13th century and has a Late Gothic triumphal cross group from the 15th century. The nave is made of fieldstones, the vault, edgings, windows and portals of brick. The pulpit is from 1698.
- Kühlungsborn Pier. The new, 240-metre-long pier in Kühlungsborn Ost, built in 1991, has been used by ships since 1999. The two original wooden piers in Kühlungsborn Ost and West were crushed by ice masses in the winters of 1929 and 1941/42 and only partially rebuilt. During East German times the piers were shortened. After the Second World War, regular boat services only for a few years. These were stopped in 1961 when the Berlin Wall was built, because it was relatively easy to escape to West Germany from here.
- The Baltic Sea watchtower near the pier. One of the later surviving East German border towers, an authentic witness to the division of Germany.
- The beach promenade, completed in 2007. From Kühlungsborn-West to the harbour promenade in the new Kühlungsborn Harbour, it is about 3,200 metres long and offers a continuous open view of the Baltic. The fine sandy beach is over 100 metres wide. The beach promenade and the harbour promenade are parts of the E9 European long distance path.
- The harbour promenade, 360 metres long, runs from the stock anchor on Strandresidenz to the flood defence gates on Deichschart by Kühlungsborn Harbour. The anchor is one of the larger of its type. It weighs 3,200 kg; is 2.45 metres from fluke to fluke, and the shaft is 3.93 metres long (excluding the shackle). The stock measures 3.57 metres.
- Monument to the victims of fascism in Strandstraße in Kühlungsborn-Ost, made in 1972 by artist, Renata Ahrens.
- The Konrad-Otto, a lifeboat owned by the German Maritime Search and Rescue Service, is stationed by the East Mole of the yacht harbour.

== Twin towns ==
- Büsum, Schleswig-Holstein, Germany
- Grömitz, Schleswig-Holstein, Germany
- Zelenogradsk, Kaliningrad Oblast, Russia

== Gallery ==
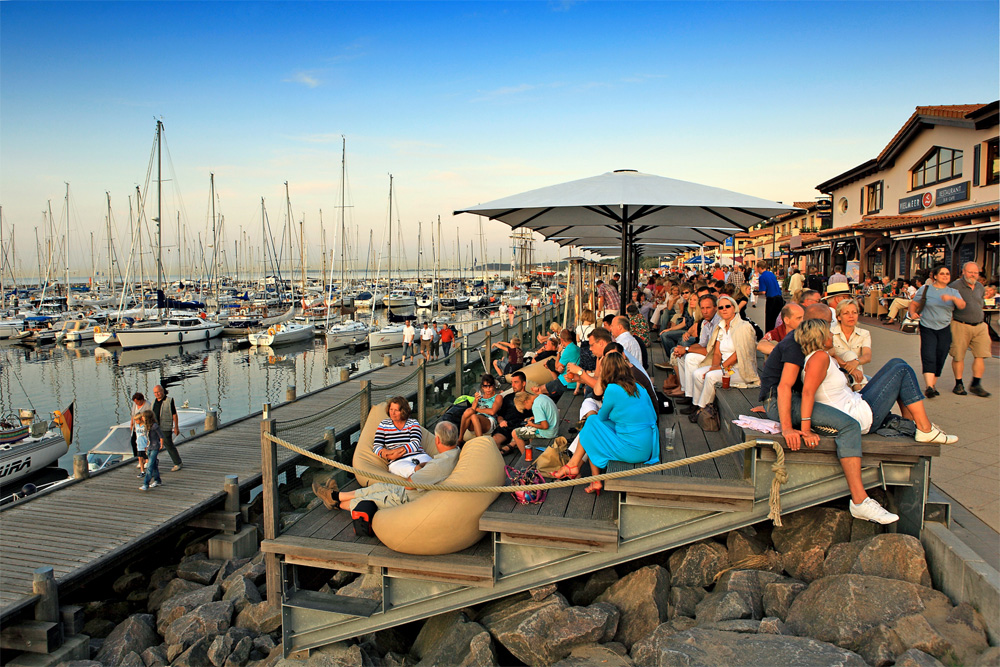
At the Kühlungsborn marina

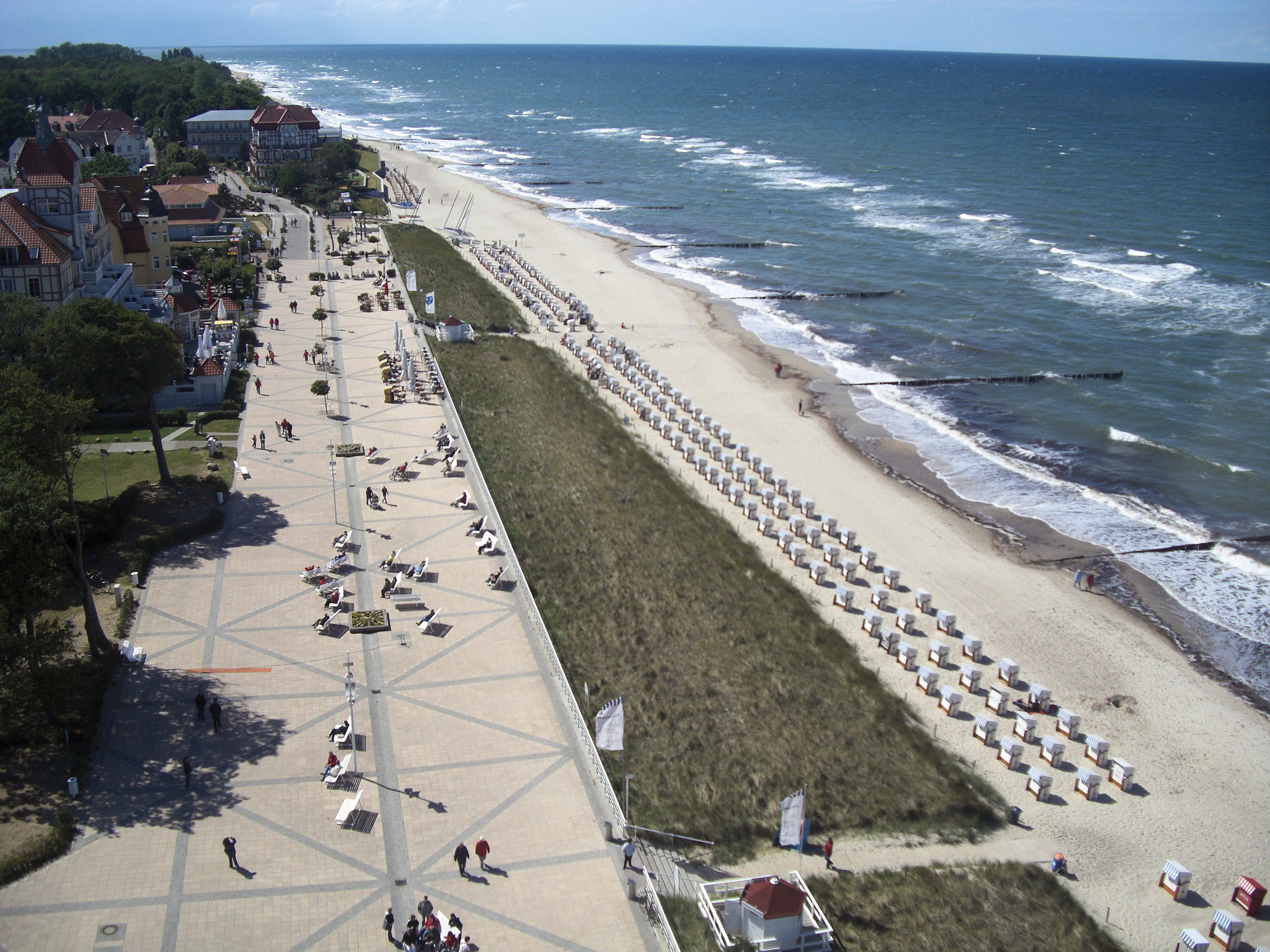
Beach promenade from above

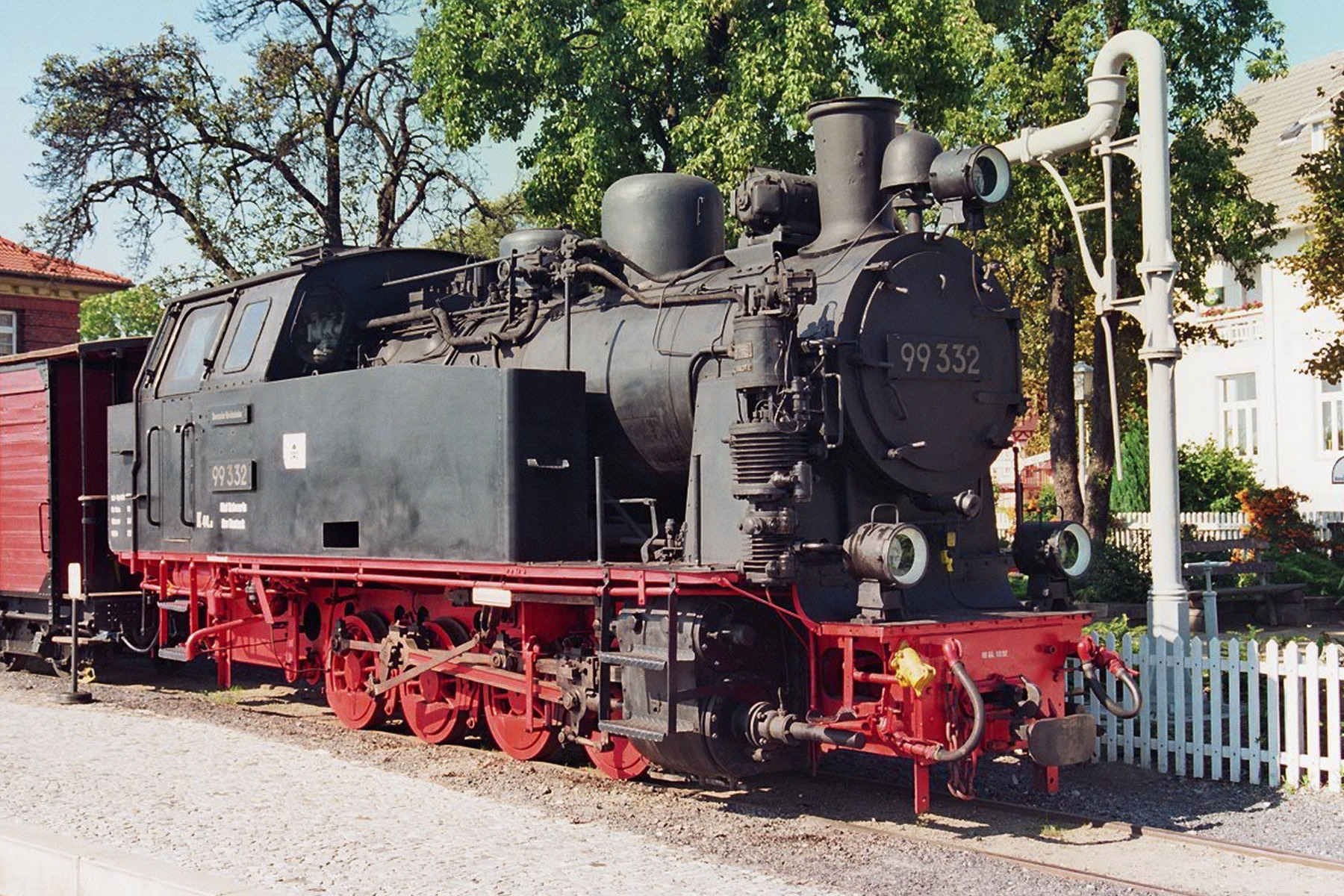
The Molli train

The Molli train pulls into Kühlungsborn Mitte station
