= Zbyszek Godlewski =

Polish protester (1952–1970)

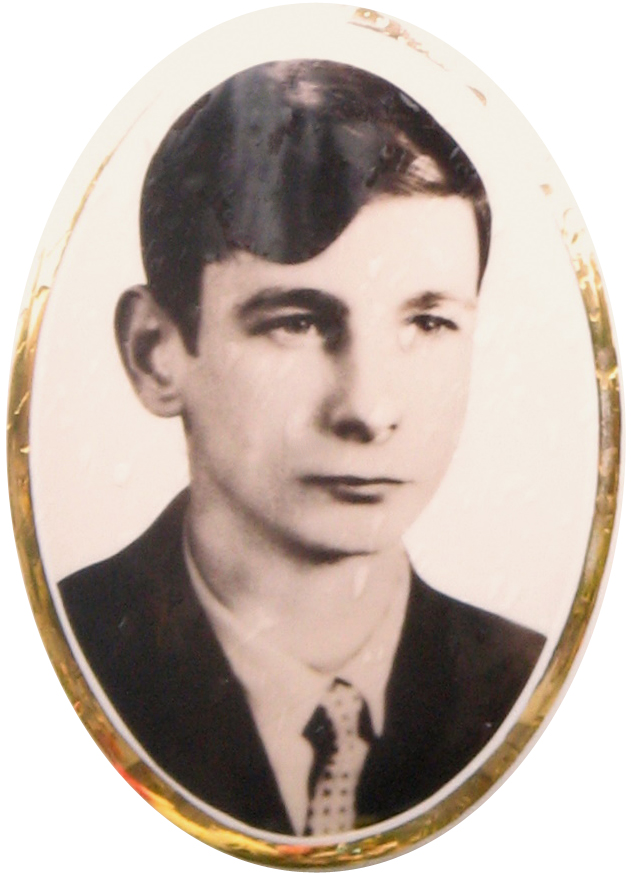
- Portrait photo of Janek Wiśniewski on his grave
- Born: Zbyszek Godlewski; 3 August 1952; Zielona Góra, Polish People's Republic
- Died: 17 December 1970 (aged 18); Gdynia, Polish People's Republic
- Cause of death: Shot
- Resting place: Elbląg, Poland
- Awards

Zbigniew Eugeniusz Godlewski (3 August 1952 – 17 December 1970) was a Polish man shot dead by security forces during the 1970 Polish protests in the city of Gdynia. The event was popularized across the country in the poem and song, known by the name of Ballad of Janek Wiśniewski (Polish pronunciation: [ˈjanɛɡ viɕˈɲɛfskʲi]).

== Biography ==
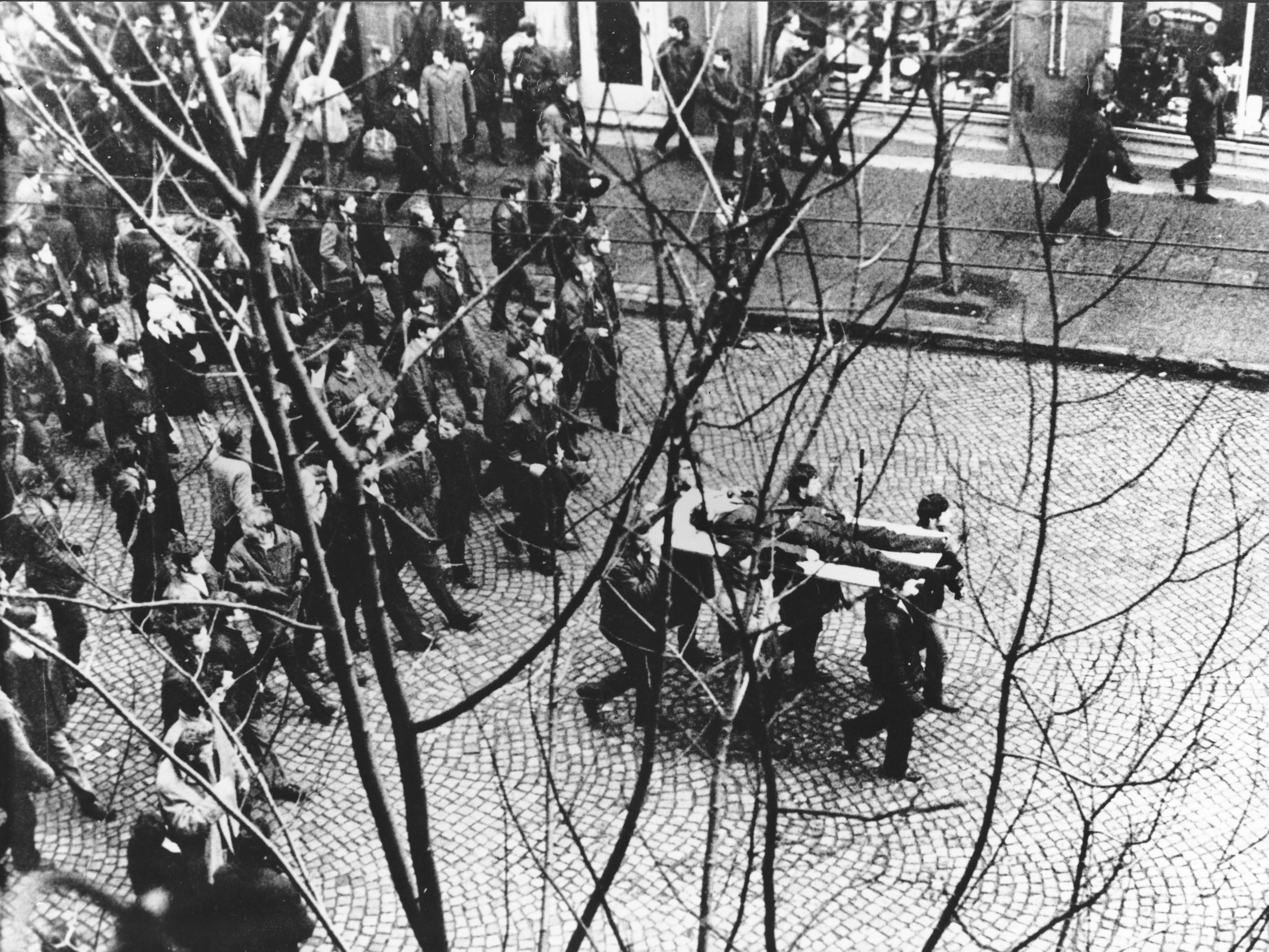
Polish 1970 protests in Gdynia: body of Zbyszek Godlewski (memorialised as Janek Wiśniewski) carried by the demonstrators on a door panel

On 17 December 1970, during Poland's demonstrations against the Communist regime, the army fired into the crowd of workers alighting from a Tricity Rapid Urban Railway train in Gdynia, under the pretext of preventing an industrial sabotage action. At least 11 civilians people were killed by the military there, and more than 40 people were killed by the police and the military during the December protests overall. The image of an anonymous young man's body carried on a door panel through the cordons of police and tanks inspired author Krzysztof Dowgiałło to write the poem about him. The name Janek Wiśniewski was invented by Dowgiałło for the ballad to symbolize an 18-year old worker killed by the military or the militia. Not knowing his real name, the author gave him a symbolic name sounding typically Polish; it proved quite enduring. Later it was established by the opposition that the man shot dead was named Zbigniew Godlewski and had lived in nearby Elbląg.

== Remembrance ==
The event was popularized across the country in the poem and song, known by the name of Ballad of Janek Wiśniewski (Polish pronunciation: [ˈjanɛɡ viɕˈɲɛfskʲi]); the work is also sometimes known as Pieśń o Janku z Gdyni (Song about Janek from Gdynia). The text was written by Krzysztof Dowgiałło and music for the song by Mieczysław Cholewa. The song, along with the story of Janek Wiśniewski, was popularized when it was performed at the end of the 1981 movie Man of Iron (by actress Krystyna Janda along with Jacek Kaczmarski). After the fall of communism in Poland, a major street in Gdynia was named after Janek Wiśniewski and also a street in Elbląg was named after Zbigniew Godlewski.

In 2011, a Polish film about the events of 17 December, titled Czarny Czwartek - Janek Wiśniewski padł ("Black Thursday - Janek Wiśniewski Has Fallen"), was released in cinemas. The title was inspired by a line in Pieśń o Janku z Gdyni. The song was covered by Kazik Staszewski and used in the film trailer.
