= Crows (film) =

1994 film

- Polish: Wrony
- Directed by: Dorota Kędzierzawska
- Written by: Dorota Kędzierzawska
- Starring: Karolina Ostrozna
- Release dates: 12 September 1994 (TIFF); 6 January 1995 (Poland)
- Running time: 66 minutes
- Country: Poland
- Language: Polish

Crows (Polish: Wrony) is a 1994 Polish drama film directed by Dorota Kędzierzawska. The film was selected as the Polish entry for the Best Foreign Language Film at the 68th Academy Awards, but was not accepted as a nominee.

== Plot ==
A crow, a girl about ten years old, lives with her mother in a neglected tenement house in a town on the coast. She is not accepted by her peers and her mother neglects her. In a physical education lesson, the girl shows up without the required costume. The teacher makes her strip down to her underwear and starts the exercises in this way, which makes her friends laugh. The ridiculed child takes the curse which he throws at his teacher.

The crow, knowing that his mother does not show her any tenderness, escapes into the world of imagination. Wandering around the picturesque city, she peers through the windows of the villa, where she notices a married couple looking after their three-year-old daughter. After hours spent in the city, the girl realizes that nothing has changed in her life. She runs away from home and then finds a villa where there was a three-year-old child. Seizing the right moment, Crow kidnaps a little girl from the garden. She tries to care for her as best she can, pretending to be a motherly bond.

The girls go to the seashore, and during the journey, the crow shares with the little girl his dreams of escape. When they both reach the fishing boat, she plans to unberth and go to sea. Inadvertently, however, she pushes the girl into the water, and immediately rushes to the rescue. Feeling guilty, Wrona takes the three-year-old girl back to the villa, and then returns home. When the mother wakes up, she finds her huddled daughter, then speaks to her with the words: "What are you doing, girl?"

== Cast ==
- Karolina Ostrozna as Crow
- Katarzyna Szczepanik as The Little (as Kasia Szczepanik)
- Malgorzata Hajewska as Crows's Mother
- Anna Prucnal as Teacher
- Ewa Bukowska as Mother of the Little
- Krzysztof Grabarczyk as Father of the Little
- Agnieszka Pilaszewska as Peter's Mother

== See also ==
- List of submissions to the 68th Academy Awards for Best Foreign Language Film
- List of Polish submissions for the Academy Award for Best Foreign Language Film
