= Danuta Szaflarska =

Polish actress (1915–2017)

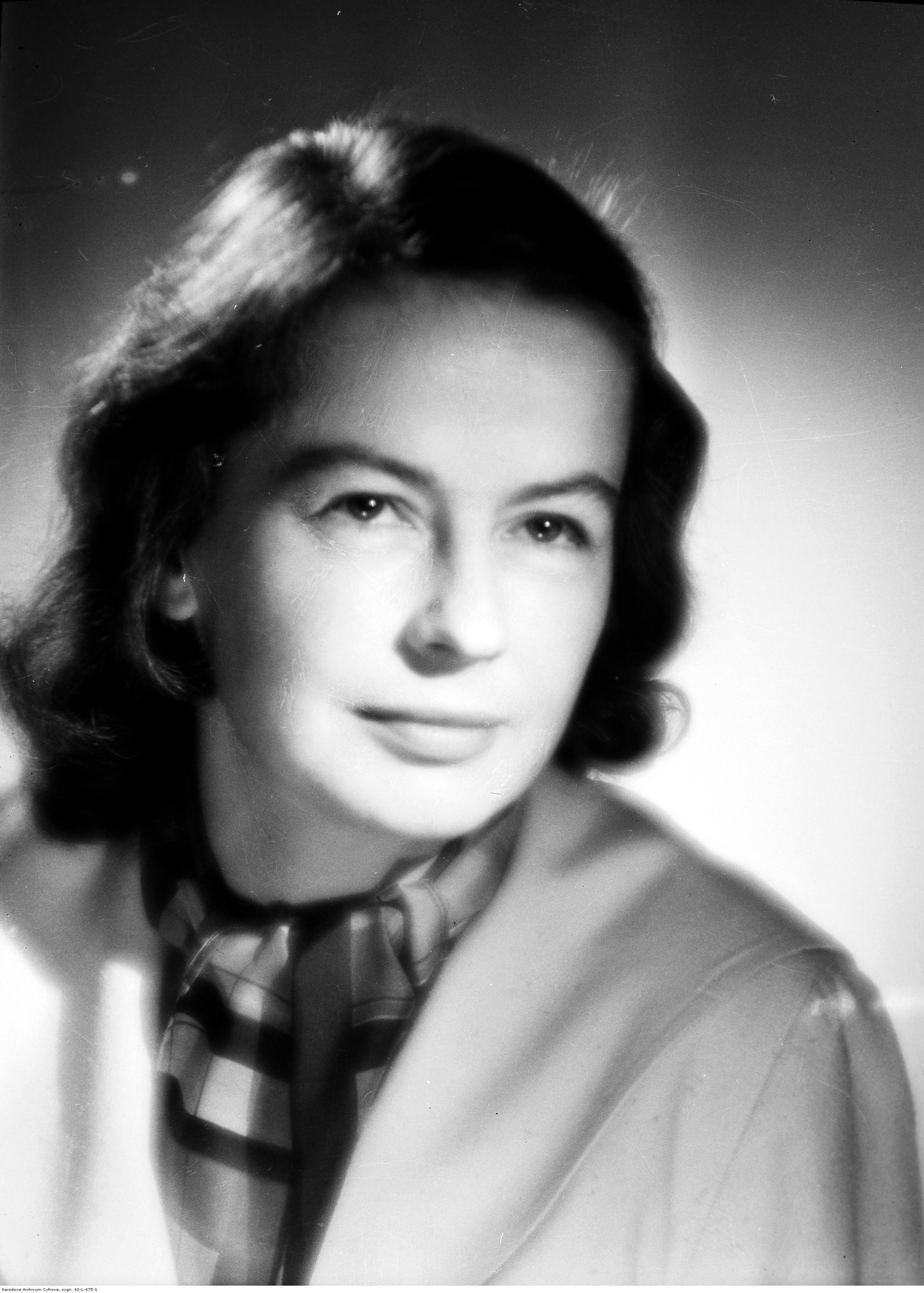
- Danuta Szaflarska
- Born: 6 February 1915; Kosarzyska, Piwniczna-Zdrój, Galicia, Austria-Hungary
- Died: 19 February 2017 (aged 102); Warsaw, Poland
- Occupation: actress
- Years active: 1939–2016
- Spouse(s): Jan Ekier (divorced); Janusz Kilański (divorced)
- Children: 2

Danuta Szaflarska (Polish pronunciation: [daˈnuta ʂafˈlaɾska]; 6 February 1915 – 19 February 2017) was a Polish film and stage actress. In 2008 she was awarded the Złota Kaczka for the best Polish actress of the century. Szaflarska participated in the Warsaw Uprising as a liaison. Szaflarska was awarded the Order of Polonia Restituta, Commander's Cross and Commander's Cross with Star, one of Poland's highest Orders and Gold Medal of Gloria Artis (2007).

== Personal life ==
Szaflarska was born in Kosarzyska, Piwniczna-Zdrój (Galicia, Austria-Hungary, now Poland). She married her first husband, Jan Ekier, a pianist, in 1942. They had one daughter, Maria. The pair divorced. Her second husband, Janusz Kilański, was a radio announcer. He was the father of Szaflarska's second daughter, Agnieszka. Kilański and Szaflarska also divorced. Szaflarska turned 100 in February 2015. She was a regular player of Teatr Rozmaitości in Warsaw, specializing in modern and progressive drama, and in her later years (till 2016) appeared in four different plays at the theatre.

== Filmography ==
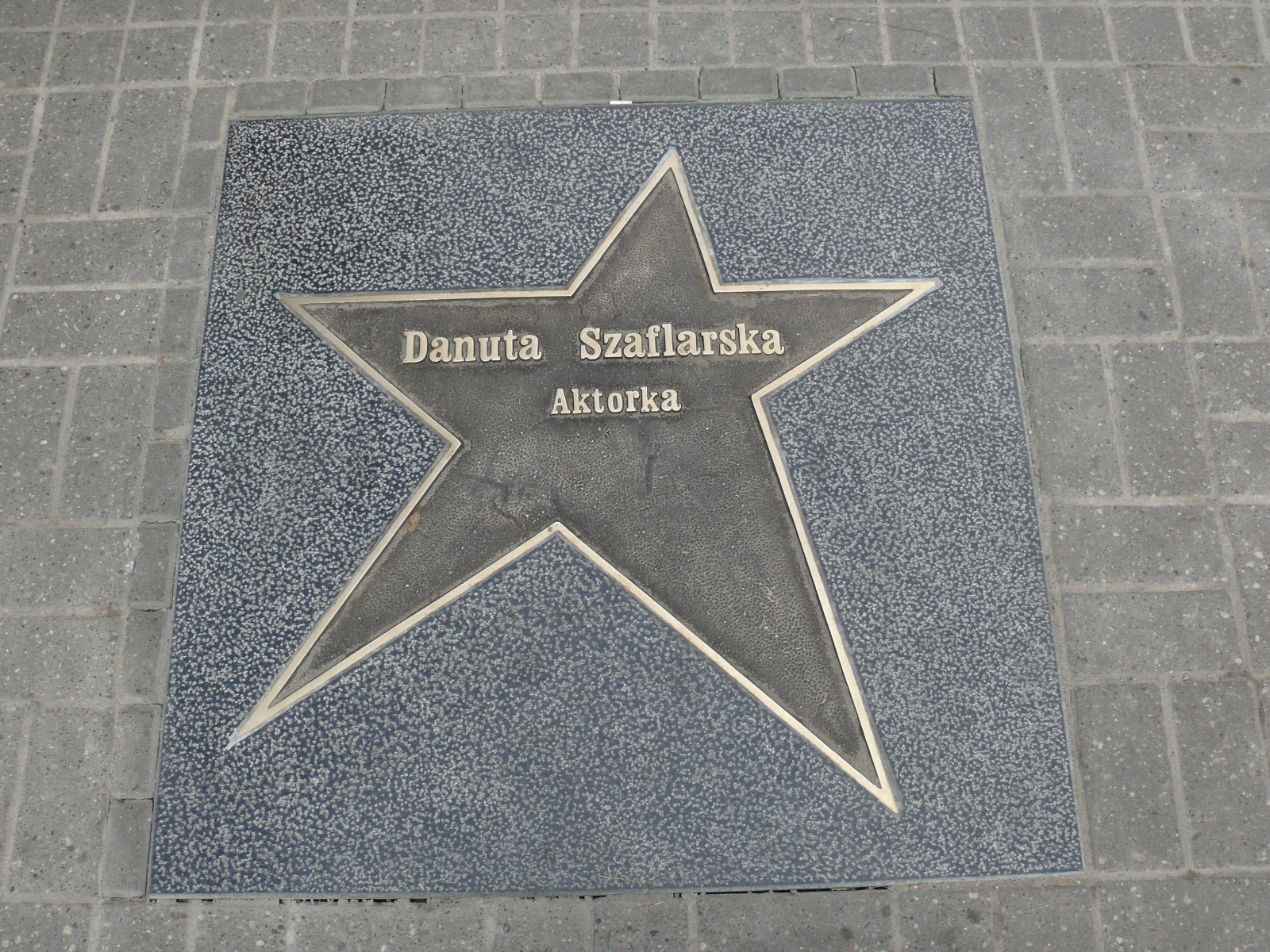
Danuta Szaflarska's star at the Hall of Fame in Łódź

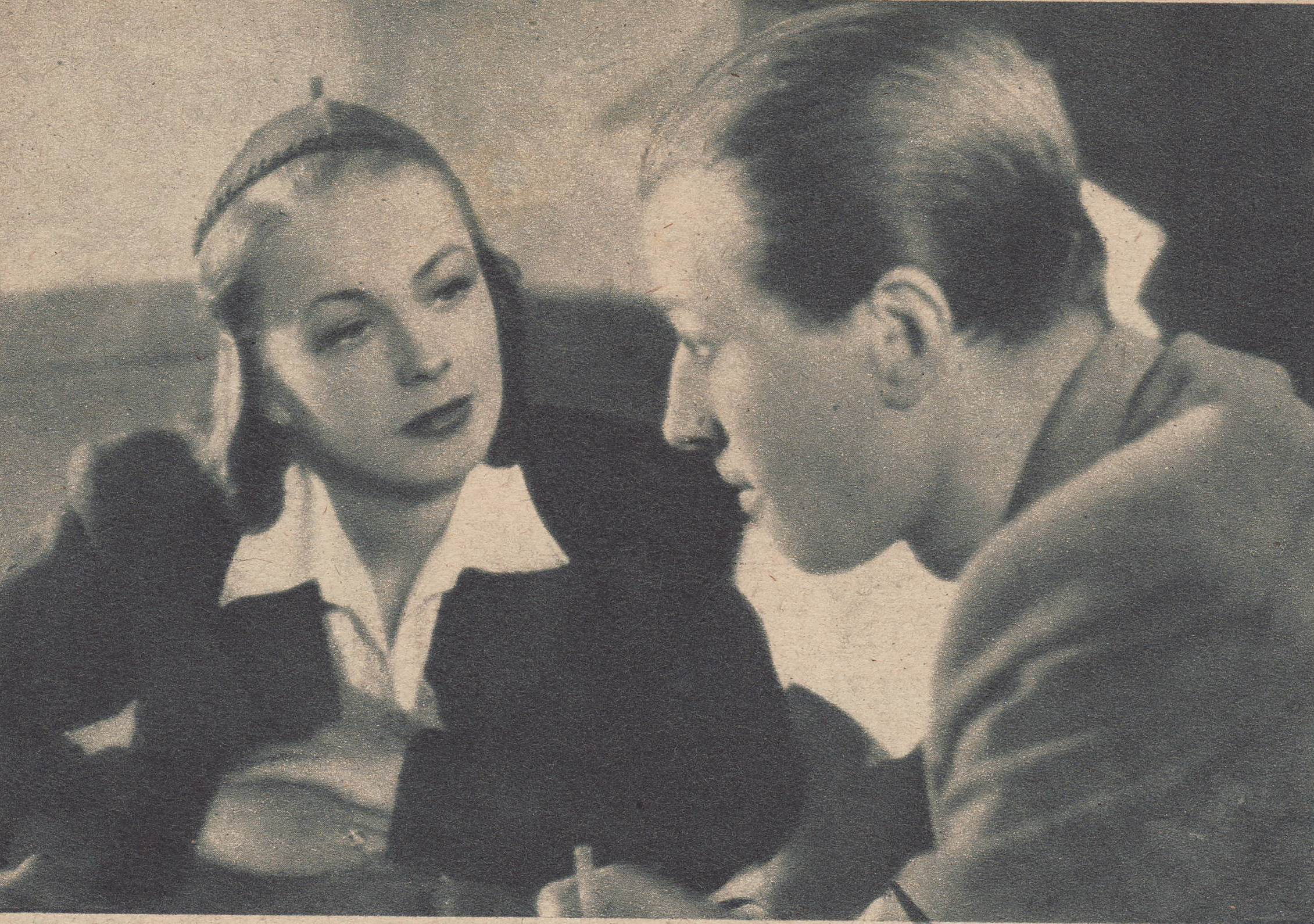
Danuta Szaflarska and Jan Świderski in Zakazane piosenki (1947)

- 1946: Dwie godziny
- 1946: Zakazane piosenki
- 1948: Skarb
- 1951: Warsaw Premiere
- 1953: Domek z kart
- 1956: Zemsta
- 1961: Dziś w nocy umrze miasto
- 1961: Ludzie z pociągu
- 1962: The Impossible Goodbye
- 1962: Głos z tamtego świata
- 1967: To jest twój nowy syn
- 1971: Pan Samochodzik i templariusze (TV series)
- 1977: Lalka (TV series)
- 1978: Umarli rzucają cień
- 1978: Wsteczny bieg
- 1980: The Green Bird
- 1982: Valley of the Issa
- 1984: 5 dni z życia emeryta
- 1986: Pokój dziecinny
- 1989: Babisia
- 1990: Korczak
- 1991: Diabły, diabły
- 1991: Skarga
- 1993: Pajęczarki
- 1993: Pożegnanie z Marią
- 1994: Faustyna
- 1995: Świt na opak
- 1996: Spóźniona podróż
- 1997: Księga wielkich życzeń
- 1998: Nic
- 1998: Siedlisko (TV series)
- 1999: Alchemik i dziewica
- 1999: Egzekutor
- 1999: Palce lizać (TV series)
- 1999: The Junction
- 1999: A Week in the Life of a Man
- 2000: Nieznana opowieść wigilijna
- 2000: Żółty szalik
- 2001: Listy miłosne
- 2001: The Spring to Come
- 2002: The Spring to Come (TV series)
- 2003: Królowa chmur
- 2004: Czwarta władza
- 2007: Ranczo Wilkowyje
- 2007: Pora umierać
- 2008: How Much Does the Trojan Horse Weigh?
- 2008: Before Twilight
- 2009: Ostatnia akcja
- 2009: Janosik. Prawdziwa historia
- 2010: Mała matura 1947
- 2012: Aftermath (Polish film)
- 2014: Między nami dobrze jest
- 2015: Mom and Other Loonies in the Family

=== Polish dubbing ===
- 1949: Spotkanie nad Łabą .... Janet Sherwood
- 1950: Rada bogów
- 1951: Śmiech w raju
- 1955: Czarna teczka .... Yvonne
- 1955: Pamiętnik majora Thompsona
- 1955: Lady and the Tramp
- 1956: Marynarzu, strzeż się
- 1962: Próba terroru
- 1962: Wspaniały Red
- 1962: Trzy plus dwa
- 1962: Julio, jesteś czarująca .... Julia
- 1963: Miecz i waga
- 1967: Kobiety nie bij nawet kwiatem
- 1968: Nie do obrony
- 1970: Zerwanie
- 1970: Trup w każdej szafie .... Sabrina
- 1971: Elizabeth R .... Kat Ashley
- 1991: Hook .... Wendy Darling
- 1994: Country Life .... Moud
- 2006: Karol: The Pope, The Man .... Mother Teresa
- 2007: Enchanted .... Narrator

== Biographical book about Danuta Szaflarska ==
In 2019, W.A.B. published a biographical book about Danuta Szaflarska, Szaflarska. Grać, aby żyć by Katarzyna Kubisiowska.

== See also ==
- List of centenarians (actors, filmmakers and entertainers)
