= Witold-K =

Polish-American artist (1932–2025)

- Born: Witold Leszek Kaczanowski; May 15, 1932; Warsaw, Warsaw Voivodeship, Second Polish Republic
- Died: March 12, 2025 (aged 92); Third Polish Republic
- Resting place: Powązki Cemetery
- Education: Academy of Fine Arts
- Spouses: Anna née Mackiewicz; Laurie Smith Kaczanowski
- Children: 3
- Father: Feliks Kaczanowski
- Website: witoldk.com

Witold (Wit) Leszek Kaczanowski (May 15, 1932 – March 12, 2025), known as Witold-K, was a Polish-American artist.

== Life and career ==
Kaczanowski was born in Warsaw, Poland, on May 15, 1932. He studied at the Warsaw Academy of Fine Arts.

One of his most remarkable works is a monumental mural at the Auschwitz Cultural Center, commemorating the victims of the Holocaust - one of the largest of its kind in Europe.

In 1964, Kaczanowski was awarded a scholarship to travel to Paris by the Ministerstwo Kultury (Polish Ministry of Culture). However, the Ministry of Public Security discovered that he had smuggled a text by Stanisław Mackiewicz with him to France, which was subsequently printed in Kultura. As a result Kaczanowski was barred from re-entering Poland.

Witold-K received an award from The American Congress for the Freedom of Culture, in Paris in 1964. After receiving the award, he was not allowed to return to Poland for many years. He moved to New York City in 1968.

In 1969, he relocated to California and briefly occupied the home of Abigail Folger and Wojciech Frykowski (both later murdered at 10050 Cielo Drive by the followers of Charles Manson) and opened his first studio and gallery in Beverly Hills (9406 Wilshire Boulevard). He also lived and worked in Santa Fe, New Mexico and Houston, Texas. Witold-K was a resident of Denver, Colorado, from 1980.

Towards the end of his life, he lived and worked in his studios in Warsaw and Konstancin-Jeziorna in Poland.

His artwork was featured in over seventy exhibitions, including forty solo shows. Highlights include a retrospective at the Otis Art Institute of Los Angeles County (1973), participation in the "Graphics by Masters" exhibition at La Boetie Gallery in New York (alongside works by Picasso, Chagall, Miró, Braque, and Giacometti, 1968), shows at the Zachęta – National Gallery of Art in Warsaw (1991), the Royal Łazienki Museum (2004), and the National Museum in Kraków (2013). In 2007, he became the first Polish artist to have a retrospective at Sotheby’s, the oldest auction house in Amsterdam.

The funeral ceremony took place on April 14, 2025 at the Funeral Home of the Powązki Military Cemetery and then at the Powązki Cemetery in Warsaw. Kaczanowski was buried in his mother's grave (section 134 - row 6 - place 24).

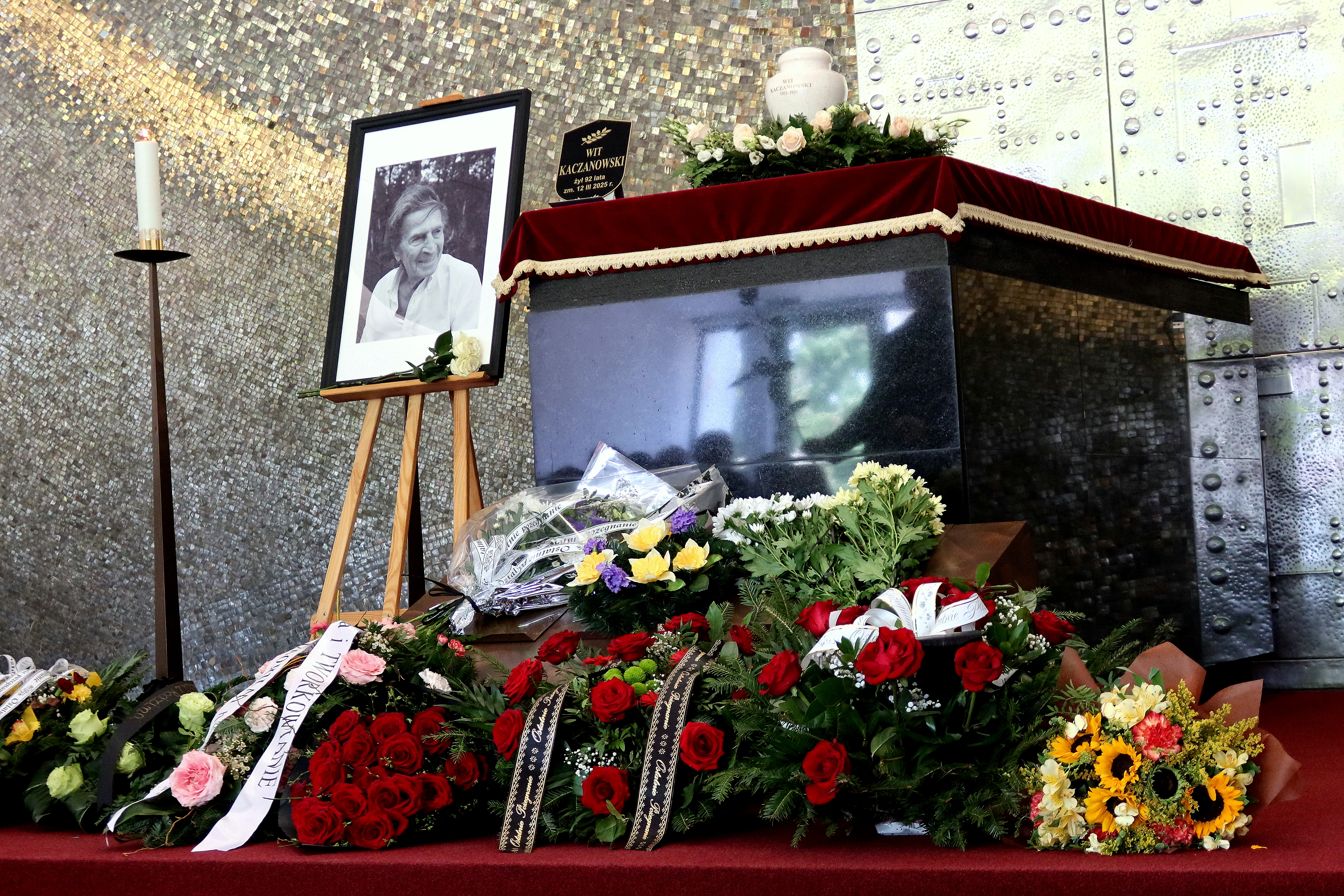
Funeral of Witold Kaczanowski at the Powązki Military Cemetery and the Powązki Cemetery in Warsaw, Poland (section: 134-6-24)

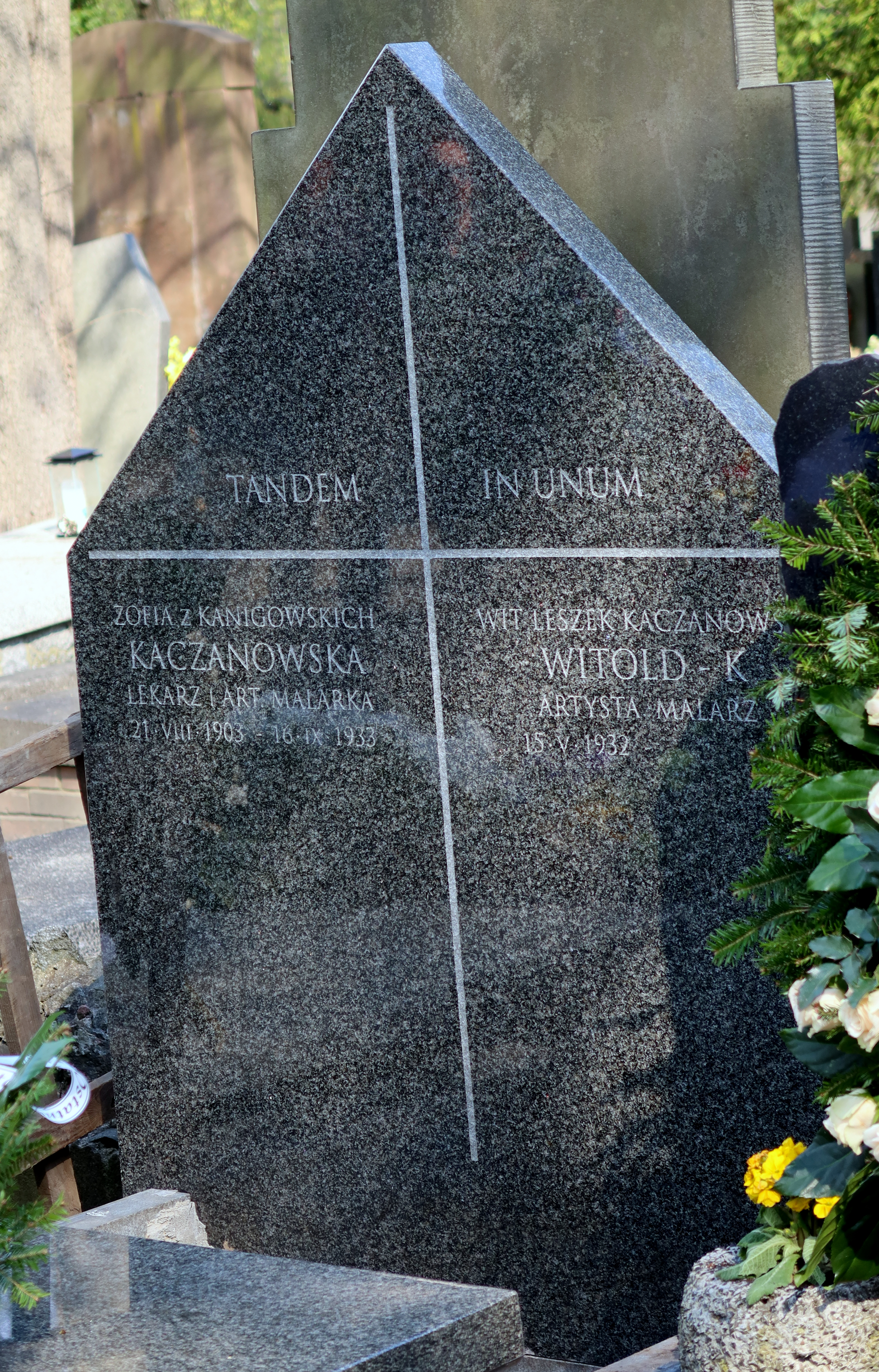
Funeral of Witold Kaczanowski at the Powązki Military Cemetery and the Powązki Cemetery in Warsaw, Poland (section: 134-6-24)
