= Witold Zalewski =

Polish writer (1921–2009)

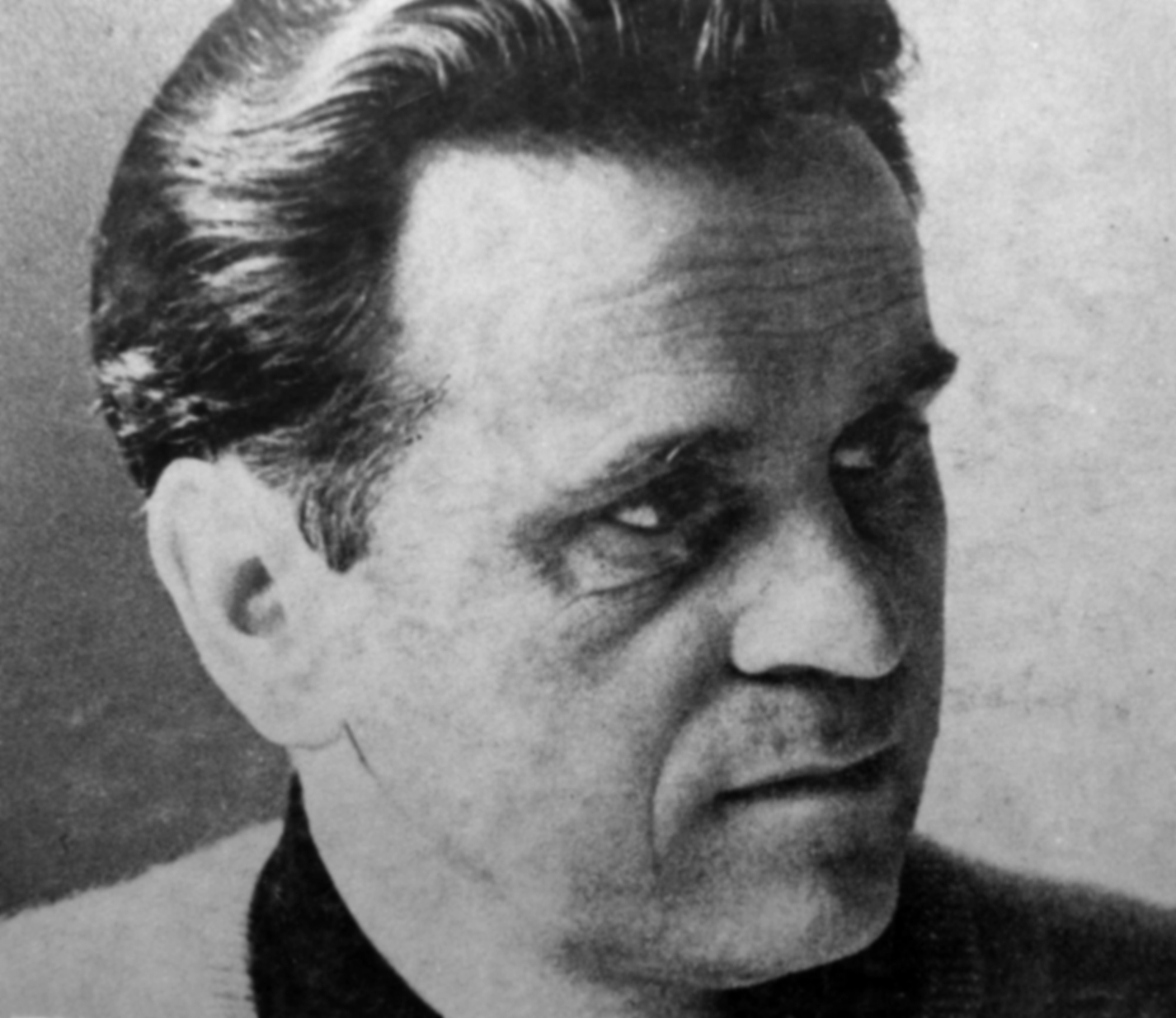
- Born: 4 January 1921 (age 105); Siedlce, Poland
- Died: 2009
- Occupations: publicist, prosaist, novelist
- Writing career
- Subjects: war, occupation, socialist realism

Witold Zalewski (4 January 1921, in Siedlce – 2009) is a Polish writer, publicist and prosaist. During the Occupation of Poland he was a soldier of Armia Krajowa and participated in Warsaw Uprising. Zalewski was associated with conspiratory magazine Dźwigary, editorial board member of weekly magazine Pokolenie (1946–1947), publicist of Przegląd Kulturalny (1952–1963), publicist of Kultura (1963–1970).

In his works, Zalewski refers to war events, his generation, and relations between his generation and socialist realism. He analyses moral choices of war and occupation period. Zalewski is an author of one of the Polish socialist-realist book Traktory zdobędą wiosnę.

== Selected works ==
- Mrok (1943) – debut story published in Dźwigary
- Śmiertelni bohaterowie (1946) – story
- Broń (1948) – novel
- Ranny w lesie (1960)
- Traktory zdobędą wiosnę (1950)
- Pruski mur (1964)
- Splot słoneczny (1972)
- Czarne jagody (1975)
- Dolina Królów (1976) – essay
- Odmiany nadziei (1968)
- Ostatni postój (1979) – novel about January Uprising
- Pożegnanie twierdzy (1985)
- Wysłannik (1988)
- Pożegnanie twierdzy (2000)
- Zakładnicy (2001) – novel with autobiographical elements

== See also ==
- Socialist realism in Poland
