= December 1970 protests in Poland =

Unrest in Poland

- Part of the Cold War and anti-communist resistance in Poland (1944–1989)
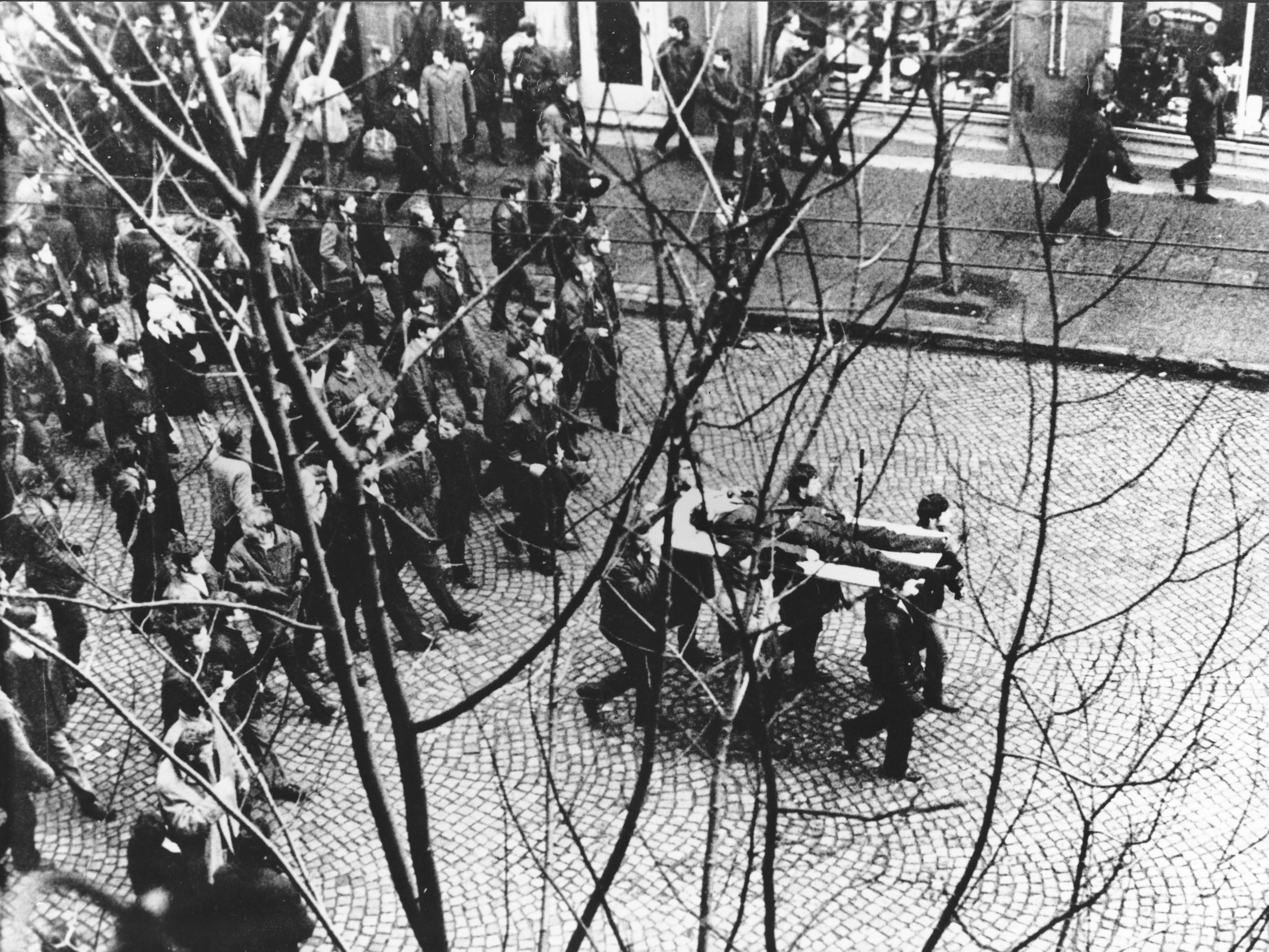
- Zbyszek Godlewski's body carried by demonstrators in Gdynia
- Date: 14–19 December 1970
- Location: Gdańsk, Gdynia, Elbląg, Szczecin
- Caused by: Massive increases in the prices of basic foodstuffs
- Methods: Demonstrations, Protests, Riots
- Result: Government victory: Protests dispersed and violently suppressed; Władysław Gomułka removed from power as First Secretary of the PZPR

Parties
Polish government: Polish United Workers' Party; Polish Army; Citizens' Militia	Protesters

Lead figures
Władysław Gomułka; Marian Spychalski; Józef Cyrankiewicz; Wojciech Jaruzelski; Tadeusz Tuczapski; Zenon Kliszko; Grzegorz Korczyński	Non-centralized leadership Some prominent figures: Zbyszek Godlewski †

Units involved
27,000 soldiers; 5,000 members of special squads of police; 550 tanks; 700 armoured personnel carriers	Several thousand protesters

Casualties and losses
Several killed and injured	Deaths: 44; Injuries: 1,000+; Arrests: 3,000+

The December 1970 protests in Poland, also known as the December 1970 events (Polish: Wydarzenia Grudnia 1970), December events (Polish: Wydarzenia grudniowe), December revolution (Polish: Rewolta grudniowa), and the Coast Massacre (Polish: Masakra na Wybrzeżu), occurred in northern Poland from 14–19 December 1970. The protests were sparked by a sudden increase in the prices of food and other everyday items while wages remained stagnant. Strikes were put down by the Polish People's Army and the Citizen's Militia, resulting in at least 44 people killed and more than 1,000 wounded.

== Background ==
In December 1970, the government suddenly announced major increases in the prices of basic foods, especially dairy products, after bad harvests throughout the year. The increases proved to be a major shock to ordinary citizens, especially in the larger cities.

== Events ==
Demonstrations against the price increases broke out in the northern Baltic coastal cities of Gdańsk, Gdynia, Elbląg, and Szczecin. The regime was concerned about an emerging wave of sabotage, which may have been inspired by the secret police, who wanted to legitimize a harsh response to the protestors. Another possible reason why the secret police would instigate sabotage and violence would be to precipitate a change in the leadership of the ruling Polish United Workers' Party (PZPR), by causing violent deaths among the workers and then blaming the party for them.

Protests started on 14 December. When a party official tried to convince the strikers to return to work, addressing them using loudspeakers on a police car, the strikers took over the police car and used the loudspeakers to announce a general strike, and to call for a demonstration in front of the party building to be held the same day. Fighting against the police started in the afternoon, and widespread fighting and rioting, including arson, continued until late in the evening.

The police started rounding up workers, often random ones who did not participate in protests or rioting, and brutally beating them, commonly using a technique in which the detainee was forced to move along a long row of policemen, all of them beating the detainee with their batons.

On 15 December in Gdańsk, strikers set fire (reportedly twice) to the building of the Provincial Committee of the ruling party, which became an iconic moment of the protests. They also took some policemen prisoner, transported them to the Gdańsk Shipyard, forced them to change into the workers' work clothing, and then transported them to a police station. Fire consumed the roof of the Provincial Committee building; the protesters were later repelled by a column of twenty OT-62 military armored personnel carriers. At least six people are known to have been killed on 15 December in Gdańsk. Two more were shot to death the next morning, at or near the Gdańsk Shipyard.

Vice prime minister Stanisław Kociołek, in his televised speech on the evening of 16 December, condemned the protesters but also called for the workers to get back to work. However, on the 16–17 December night, the Gdynia Shipyard was surrounded by the police and the army, including tanks. Responding to the vice PM's appeal proved deadly to some of the workers. In Gdynia, the soldiers had orders to stop workers returning to work and on 17 December fired into the crowd of workers emerging from their trains; at least 11 of them were killed. Then, in other parts of Gdynia, people were shot dead while protesting, bringing the official death toll in Gdynia to 18. The number of the wounded in Gdynia is far from certain but is estimated to be in the hundreds.

The protest movement then spread to other cities, leading to strikes and occupations. The government mobilized 5,000 members of special squads of police and 27,000 soldiers equipped with heavy tanks and machine guns. Overall, more than 1,000 people were wounded and at least 44 killed.

== Resolution ==
The Party leadership met in Warsaw and decided that a full-scale working-class revolt was inevitable unless drastic steps were taken. With the consent of Leonid Brezhnev in Moscow, Gomułka, Kliszko, and other leaders were forced to resign: if the price rises had been a plot against Gomułka, it succeeded. Since Moscow would not accept Mieczysław Moczar, Edward Gierek was drafted as the new leader. The price increases were reversed, wage increases announced, and sweeping economic and political changes were promised. Gierek went to Gdańsk and met the workers, apologised for the mistakes of the past, promised a political renewal and said that, as a worker himself, he would now govern for the people.

Stanisław Kociołek lost the position of vice prime minister. For a short time he remained a member of the Central Committee, but in February 1971 he was reassigned to diplomatic service. That was soon after in January 1971, in a reversal of the previous policy of secrecy, government-controlled media published the list of 44 people who were killed during the protests.

== Impact ==
Although the aims of the protesters were mostly social and economic rather than political, the riots reinvigorated the dormant political activity of Polish society. Nevertheless, the workers from the coast did not prevent the government from implementing its goal of increased food prices; that was only achieved a few weeks later, after the 1971 Łódź strikes.

Polish protests elicited broad sympathy and support, both in Western Europe and the Soviet bloc. There were copycat strikes on the Kühlungsborn Pier in East Germany and in Riga; Soviet sailors on stranded Soviet ships shared their food with the citizens of Gdańsk and Szczecin, while Polish strikers shielded Soviet families in Poland from reprisals.

Subsequent protests broke out in 1976 and 1980. The latter led to the Gdańsk Agreement and founding of the Solidarity union.

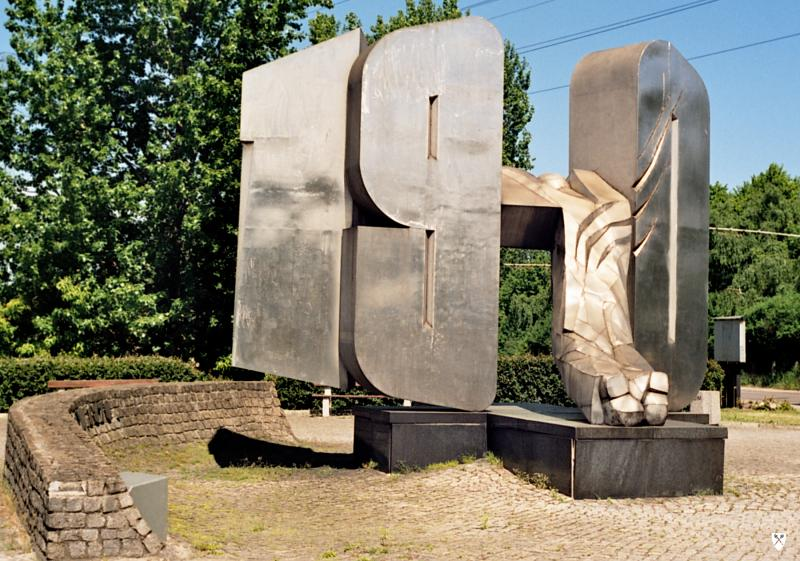
Monument to victims of the 1970 protests in Gdynia

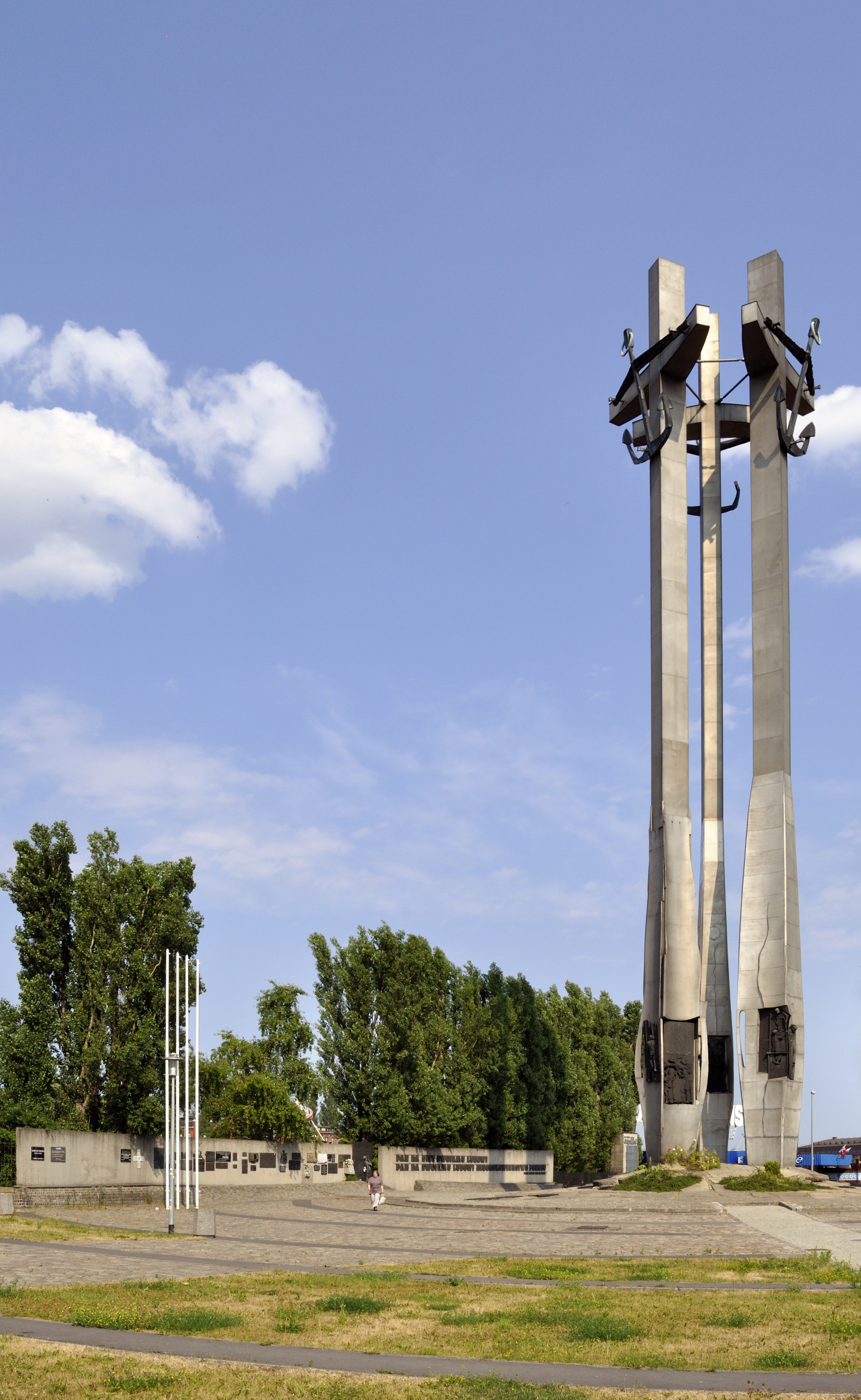
Monument to the Fallen Shipyard Workers of 1970 in Gdańsk

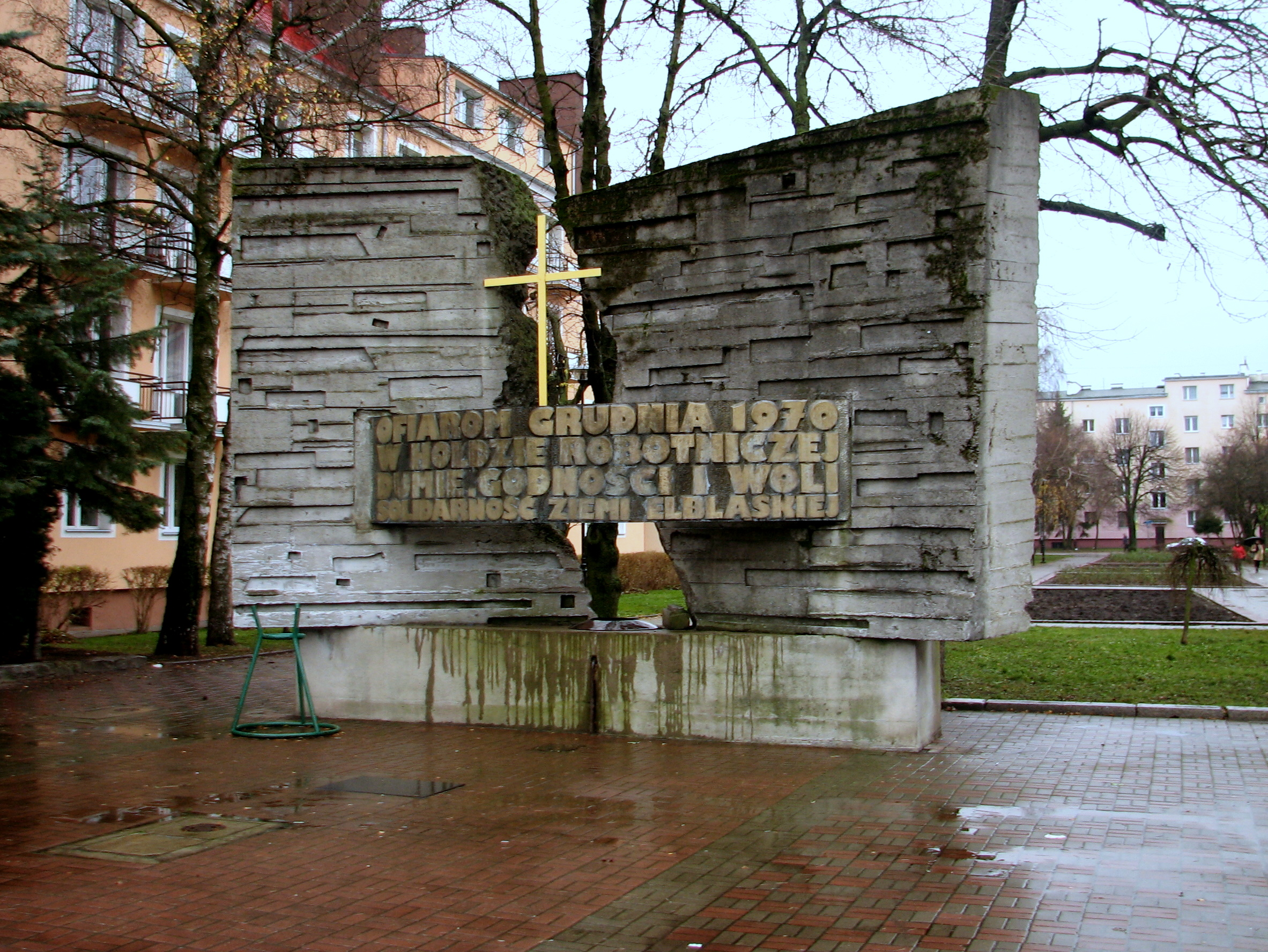
Monument to victims of massacres during the 1970 protests in Elbląg

== See also ==
- Jack Strong, a 2014 Polish film about Ryszard Kukliński, who was partly motivated by the massacre to spy for NATO
- Janek Wiśniewski, a fictional name given to then-unknown young victim, immortalised in Janek Wiśniewski poem and songs.
- Man of Iron, a 1981 movie by Andrzej Wajda in which the massacre plays an important role.
- Strike, a 2006 Polish-German movie about the Solidarity Movement.
- Czarny Czwartek. Janek Wiśniewski padł, a 2011 movie by Antoni Krauze.
