= Kühlungsborn Pier =

Pier in Kühlungsborn, Germany

Coordinates: 54°09′19″N 11°45′45″E

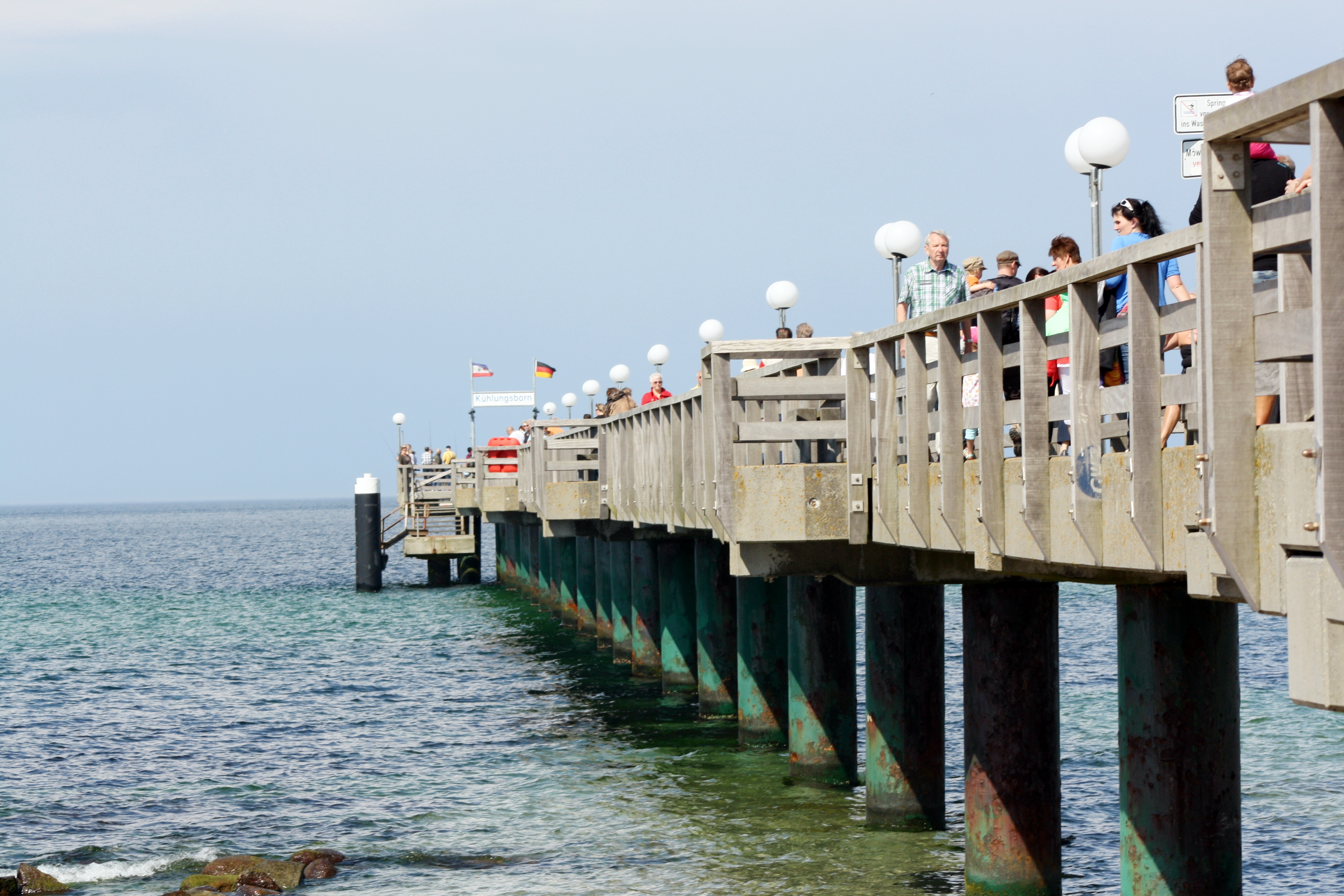
The pier in Kühlungsborn

Kühlungsborn Pier (German: Seebrücke Kühlungsborn) is a pier on the Baltic Sea coast in Kühlungsborn in the German county of Rostock (Mecklenburg-Western Pomerania).

== History and architecture ==
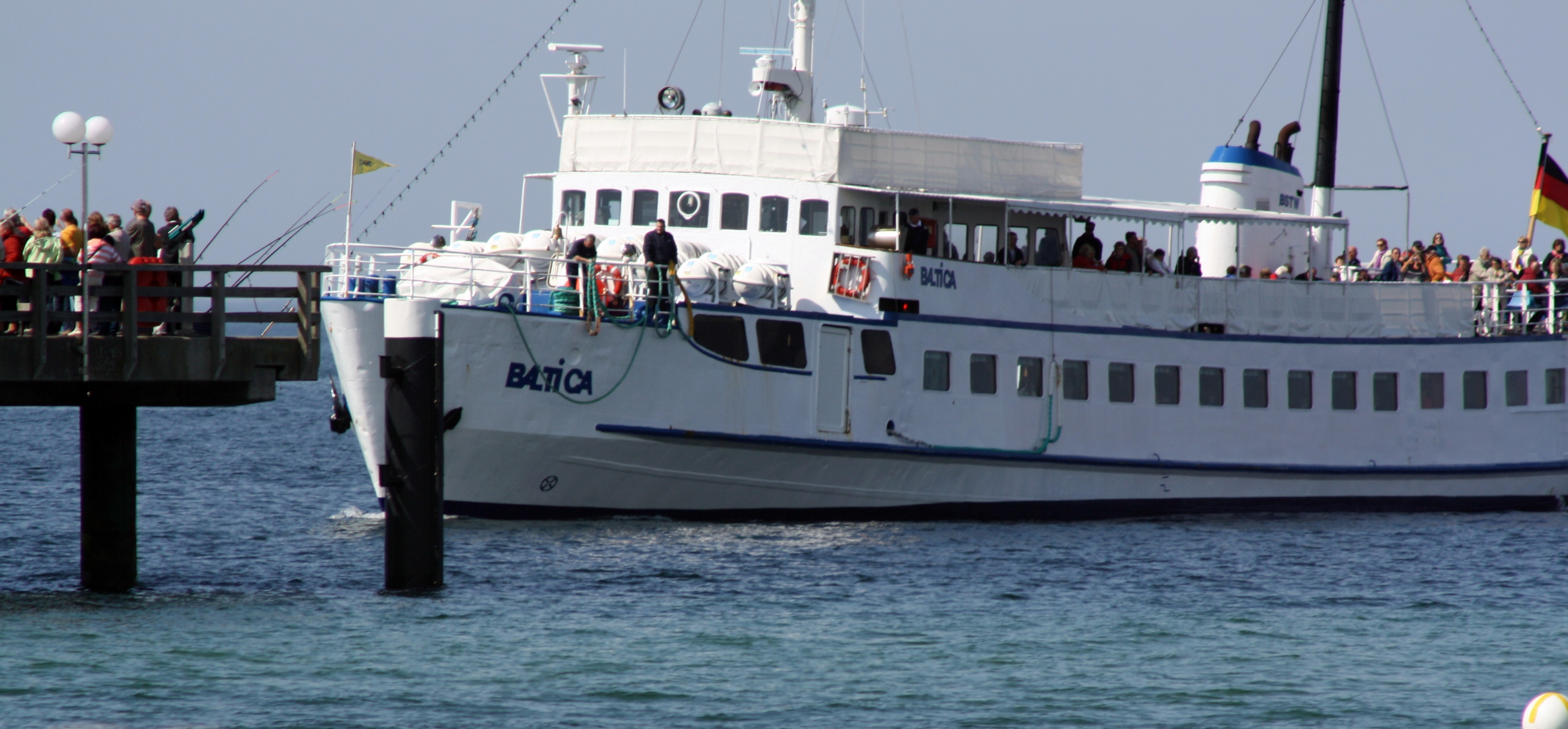
Baltica berthing at the pier

The first jetties were built from about 1895; they were the forerunners of those in Brunshaupten and Arendsee. Because these simple wooden structures could not cope with the strong ice drift in the winter, they frequently had to be replaced. The first large jetties were built in 1901 to enable sailing boat services to call here. In 1906, piers were built large enough to enable steamboats to tie up, thus negating the inconvenience of ferrying passengers from the ships in tenders. A pier was built in 1929, but this, too, could not withstand the weather. The last pier was destroyed in the winter of 1941/42. During East German times, the continued shortage of material and construction capacity prevented a new pier being built. This also prevented people escaping the country to the West.

The new pier was built in 1991 in the suburb of Ost. It is 240 metres long and oriented axially to the beach road (Strandstraße). The pier is located on the longest German Baltic Sea beach promenade, which is about 3.2 km long, and the pier was the first new pier to be built on the Baltic Sea coast in Mecklenburg. It is considered to be one of the landmarks of the town and is one of the 189 piers in the state of Mecklenburg-Western Pomerania.

== Pier forecourt ==
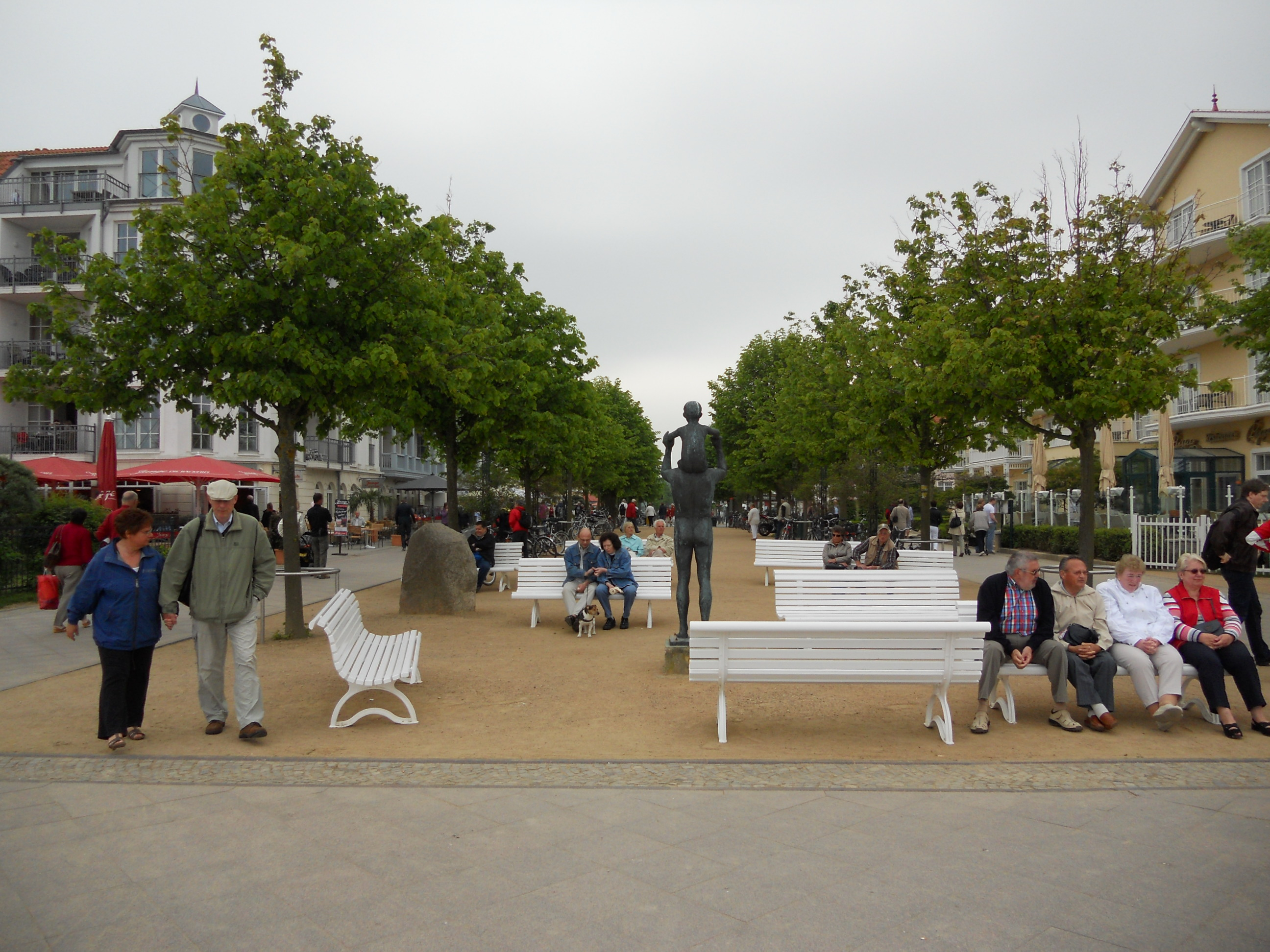
Pier forecourt with the protected sculpture of Vater und Sohn ("Father and Son")

The remodelling of the pier forecourt was carried out in phases. The Kopfsituation, with its Forum and Bastion, was built in 1992. The forecourt was designed in 1991. The running area (Laufachse) and ramps, the pavements and the play area (Spielachse) were added in 1995. On the forecourt the protected sculpture Vater und Sohn ("Father and Son"), sculpted in the 1970s by Reinhard Schmidt, has been erected.

== Literature ==
- Stadterneuerung und Stadtentwicklung im Wandel der Zeit published by the town of Kühlungsborn, second, updated edition of November 2006
