= Trances (film) =

1981 Moroccan documentary film

- Directed by: Ahmed El Maanouni
- Screenplay by: Ahmed El Maanouni
- Produced by: Izza Génini; Souheil Ben-Barka
- Cinematography: Ahmed El Maanouni
- Edited by: Jean-Claude Bonfanti
- Music by: Nass El Ghiwane
- Release date: 1981
- Running time: 88 minutes
- Country: Morocco
- Language: Arabic

Trances (Arabic: الحال, romanized: al-ḥāl; French: Transes) is a 1981 documentary film about the influential Moroccan avant-pop band Nass El Ghiwane. It was shot, written, and directed by Ahmed El Maanouni.

== Summary ==
The film is primarily composed of scenes portraying the band performing concerts in Morocco, interspersed with excerpts from interviews with band members about the meaning of their songs and music. The film also includes archival footage of colonial-era Morocco in the form of flashback sequences, as well as personal moments in the band members' daily lives.

== Production history ==
Maânouni presented a working copy of the film to its eventual producer, Izza Génini (known for distributing musical films), at the first screening of his previous film Alyam, Alyam. After hearing Larbi Batma's voice and attending a concert held by the band, Génini offered her services to Maânouni as a producer. Soon, the initial project (which was a filmed concert) expanded in scope to become a feature-length documentary following the band's activities.

Originally released in 1981, it was restored in 2007 by the World Cinema Foundation at Cineteca di Bologna/L'Immagine Ritrovata Laboratory. The film was picked specifically by Martin Scorsese for the World Cinema Foundation's first release and was screened at the Cannes Film Festival in 2007 and at Djemaa el-Fna square in Marrakesh, Morocco. The film has since been distributed by the Criterion Collection.
