= Nass El Ghiwane =

Moroccan band

- Origin: Casablanca, Morocco
- Genre: Moroccan
- Years active: 1969–present
- Members: Rachid Batma, Hamid Batma, Abdelkrim Chifa, Omar Sayed
- Past members: Abd El-Aziz Tahiri, Abderahmane Kirouche (Paco), Boujemaa Ahgour, Larbi Batma, Allal Yaala

Nass El Ghiwane (Arabic: ناس الغيوان) are a musical group established in 1969 in Casablanca, Morocco. The group, which originated in avant-garde political theater, has played an influential role in Moroccan chaabi (or shaabi).

Nass El Ghiwane were the first band to introduce Western instruments like the modern banjo. Their music incorporates a trance aesthetic, reflecting the influence of local gnawa music, and is inspired by ancient North African Sufi poetry, most prominently that of Abderrahman El Majdoub, whose work was a direct inspiration to the band. They are also credited with helping bring a new social movement to Morocco. The group was called "The Rolling Stones of Africa" by Martin Scorsese and was one of few Moroccan bands to receive international media attention.

== Name ==
In an interview with Al Bayan, Omar Sayed explained that, in Morocco, the term Nass El Ghiwane (ناس الغيوان "people of song") refers to practitioners of the malhun musical -.

== In film ==
The band is the focus of music documentary Trances, directed by Ahmed El Maanouni, who described Nass El Ghiwane as Morocco's soul music. Originally released in 1981, it was restored in 2007 by the World Cinema Foundation at Cineteca di Bologna /L'Immagine Ritrovata Laboratory. The film was picked specifically by Martin Scorsese for the World Cinema Foundation's first release and was screened at the Cannes Film Festival in 2007 and at Djemaa el-Fna square in Marrakesh, Morocco. The film has since been distributed by the Criterion Collection.

The band's song "Ya Sah" appears in the film The Last Temptation of Christ and on the associated album Passion – Sources. The film's director, Martin Scorsese, credits Nass El Ghiwane with opening a new universe to him.

Nass El Ghiwane's music was featured in the award-winning 2023 documentaryThe Mother of All Lies.

== Members ==
- Abdelaziz al-Tahiri: Founding member, replaced by Abderrahmane Paco in 1974
- Allal Yaala: Founding member, banjo player
- Boujmii Hgour: Singer, poet, composer. Founding member, played with the group until his death in 1974
- Larbi Batma: Actor, singer, percussionist. Founding member, played with the group until his death in 1997
- Omar Sayed: Singer, actor, percussion; founding member
- Abderrahmane "Paco" Kirouche (1948-2012): Singer, composer, played with the group until 1993
- Raifak Redouane: 1991 to 2001
- Mahmoud Saadi: Left the group in the 1970s
- Rachid Batma: Singer, percussionist, since 1996
- Hamid Batma: Since 2000
- Abdelkrim Chifa: Since 2002

== Discography ==
- Assallama
- Hommage à Boudjemma
- Ya bani el-insan
- Ya Nass El Maana
- Wannadi Ana
- Taghounja
- Aali ou Khalli
- Houde Ennaana
- Soubhane Allah
- A lotf Allah el khafi
- Fine ghadi biya khouya
- Lebtana
- Narjak Ana la M'chite
- Ya saielni
- Mahmouma
- Oulad el Aalam
- L'jamra
- Salama

Live albums

- Nass El Ghiwane Live Olympia 76
- El ghaba – Live
- Echams Etalaa – Live Olympia
- Nass el Ghiwane Live Casablanca
- Nass el Ghiwane Live (feat. Boudjemaa)

Contributing artist

- Passion – Sources (1989, Real World Records)
- The Rough Guide to the Music of Morocco (2004, World Music Network)
