= Peter Murphy =

Peter Murphy may refer to:

== Arts and entertainment ==
- Peter Murphy (broadcaster) (1923–2011), Irish radio and television broadcaster
- Peter Murphy (musician) (born 1957), British musician with the band Bauhaus
- Peter Murphy (artist) (born 1959), English Stuckist artist

== Politics and law ==
- Peter P. Murphy (1801–1880), American politician, New York state senator
- Peter Murphy (businessman) (1853–1925), Australian politician
- Peter J. Murphy (1860–1916), American politician, Wisconsin state assemblyman
- Pete Murphy (1872–1946), American politician, North Carolina state representative and college football player
- Peter Murphy (Maryland politician) (born 1949), American politician, member of the Maryland House of Delegates
- Peter Murphy (JAG) (fl. 2000s), American lawyer and officer in the United States Marine Corps

== Sports ==
- Peter Murphy (footballer, born 1922) (1922–1975), English footballer with Coventry City, Tottenham Hotspur and Birmingham City
- Peter Murphy (rugby league) (born 1941), Scottish rugby league footballer
- Peter Murphy (hurler) (born 1961), Irish hurler
- Peter Murphy (rower) (born 1967), Australian Olympic rower
- Peter Murphy (footballer, born 1980), Irish international footballer; current Queen of the South manager
- Peter Murphy (footballer, born 1990), English footballer with Wycombe Wanderers

== Others ==
- Peter William Murphy (died 1976), New Zealand police officer
- Peter Murphy (executive) (born 1962), American businessman

== See also ==
- Peta Murphy, Australian politician
