= Zaari =

Zaari (Arabic: الزعري) is a Moroccan surname. Notable people with the surname include:

- Brahim Zaari (born 1989), Dutch footballer
- Mustapha Zaari (1945–2024), Moroccan actor and comedian
