= Les Coeurs brûlés =

Les Coeurs brûlés may refer to:

- Burned Hearts (French: Les Coeurs brûlés), a 2007 Moroccan film
- Les Coeurs brûlés (miniseries), a French miniseries
