= Case of Amina El Filali =

Moroccan woman forced to marry her abuser

On 10 March 2012, Amina El Filali (sometimes also referred to as Amina Filali) (1996–2012), a 16-year-old girl from Larache, Morocco, committed suicide by taking rat poison, after she was forced by her family to marry a man who had raped her when she was 15. According to Article 475 of the Moroccan penal code, the rapist can avoid prosecution by marrying his victim. This incident drew much attention to Moroccan law, and many people expressed a desire to have the law changed.

Local human rights groups also called for the repeal of Article 475 of the Moroccan penal code, which decriminalises rape by someone who later marries their victim. Two years after the suicide, in, 2014, the Moroccan Parliament decided to modify Article 475.

A documentary about Amina Filali was released in 2013, which found that there had been four similar incidents in the town's history.

== Suicide and immediate reactions ==
Amina El Filali killed herself by ingesting rat poison. According to members of her family, she did so out of despair after being forced to marry Mustafa Fellaq, a man ten years older than her who had raped her twice. In spite of confusion in the accounts of her family and rapist-husband immediately after, Mustapha El Khalfi, the government's spokesperson and minister of Communications declared: "The girl was raped twice, the last one when she was married. We have to do an in-depth study of the situation and of the possibility of giving stricter sentences in the framework of a revision of article 475. We cannot ignore this tragedy."

The suicide immediately caused great national and international outrage. People shared the story and their outrage on social media. A Twitter account and a hashtag #RIPAmina on Twitter were active with thousands of messages around the world, and an online petition "Avaaz-RIP Amina" had gathered more than 770 000 signatures by the month of April 2012. Although their numbers were much more reduced (200 to 400), people also demonstrated. In Larache, sit-ins were organized in front of the court which would have been responsible for Amina's case. A demonstration was also held in front of Parliament with people holding placards saying: "We are all Aminas", "Clause 475 killed me", "RIP Amina." International media also widely covered the story. They called for the punishment of the rapist, but mostly for a revision of a law considered outdated and criminal. In the words of Khadija Rouggani, a lawyer and activist: "She was the victim of a law that erases with a stroke of an eraser a double crime: the corruption of a minor and rape. The incriminated article 475 is only one of the numerous dispositions of the penal code that reveal its patriarchal and conservative philosophy. Women are reduced to bodies to be controlled."

While the Minister of Justice Mustafa Ramid, from the governing Islamist Justice and Development Party, released a statement in which he mentioned Amina's consent rather than a rape, the Ministry of Justice itself published another release in which it assured that it respected the law and the higher interest of the child [Amina El Filali] by not suing. The Democratic league of women's rights filed a complaint so that Amina El Filali's rapist-husband might be judged. In the meantime, Al Massae, Morocco's most popular daily newspaper, organized a roundtable and invited Bassima Hakkaoui, the Minister of Women, Family and Social Development (and the only female minister in the government), Amina's family as well as, more surprisingly, her rapist-husband, sparking further outrage, although he did not attend.

== Article 475 and its modification ==
The text of article 475 before it was amended in 2014 contained the following mention: "When a female minor of marriageable age thus abducted or corrupted has married her abductor, the later can only be sued if the plaintiffs qualify to ask for the annulment of the marriage, and can only be condemned after the annulment has been pronounced" ("Lorsqu'une mineure nubile ainsi enlevée ou détournée a épousé son ravisseur, celui-ci ne peut être poursuivi que sur la plainte des personnes ayant qualité pour demander l'annulation du mariage et ne peut être condamné qu'après que cette annulation du mariage a été prononcée").

The Moroccan government announced plans to repeal the law about one year after Amina Filali's suicide. The Parliament ultimately voted to modify the article on January 22, 2014, and the new article was issued in February 2014. The mention of marriage was taken out. The current article 475 only states the following: "Anyone who, without violence, threats or fraud, abducts or corrupts a minor of less than 18 year-old is punished with one to five years in prison and a penalty of 200 to 500 dirhams."

However, feminist groups remained critical, underlining that other parts of the penal code still needed to be reformed, for example the distinction between "plain rape" and "deflowering rape", or the non-recognition of conjugal rape.

== See also ==
- 475, a Moroccan documentary film about Amina Filali
- Marry-your-rapist law
- Les griffes du passé, a fictional movie by Abdelkrim Derkaoui, partially inspired by Amina Filali's story, came out in 2014.
- Moroccan rock band Lazywall made a song in darija about Amina Filali. It is entitled "Ana Amina" (I am Amina) and came out in 2015 accompanied by a video.
