= Passion – Sources =

1989 film music album by Peter Gabriel

Compilation album by Various artists
- Released: 1989
- Recorded: 1 July 1971 (7)
- Studios: Real World Studios, England; Addis Ababa
- Genre: World music
- Length: 42:18
- Label: Real World Records
- Producers: Mohammed Ayuub; Peter Gabriel; Shankar; Kudsi Erguner; Hossam Ramzy; Tiberiu Alexandru; Mahmoud Tabrizi Zadeh; Nass El Ghiwane; Les Musiciens de Nil; Robert Ataian

Passion – Sources is the second of two albums of music from Martin Scorsese's film The Last Temptation of Christ. The first album, Passion by Peter Gabriel, was released in 1989 in conjunction with the movie. Passion – Sources is a compilation of songs by various artists from Armenia, Egypt, Ethiopia, Guinea, India, Iran, Morocco, Pakistan, Senegal, and Turkey. Gabriel does not perform on the album, but produced or co-produced several tracks.

== Background ==
It is a supplementary release to Passion, containing musical influences on the latter album. As critic Roger Catlin describes, the release of Sources was "an understandable indulgence", as Gabriel's Passion (containing internationally-influenced instrumental music) "could have used the descriptions for those who wanted to look further." The release of Sources was announced when Passion was released. Catlin said that, by releasing Passion – Sources, it appeared that "Gabriel, long a champion of world music before it became a marketing catch phrase, seemed a little sheepish about liberally borrowing ideas and melodies from his assembled musicians, who were largely unknown to his Western pop audience."

In his liner notes, Gabriel describes the album as "a selection of some of the traditional music, sources of inspiration, and location recordings." Gabriel mentioned in an interview with Keyboard magazine that his goal with the album was to provide the musicians he worked with on Passion "a chance to do their music in their way without being inhibited by my musical designs."

The album largely eschews modern Western instruments and production techniques, and consists of studio and location recordings from artists who had worked on Passion or had influenced the creation of the album. It was one of the first albums released on Real World Records, which was created as a joint venture between Gabriel and WOMAD in 1989.

== Critical reception ==
Professional ratings
Review scores
Source	Rating
AllMusic	4.5/5 stars
Chicago Tribune	2/4 stars
NME	6/10
Red Deer Advocate	3.5/5 stars

In a contemporary review, Jonathan Romney of NME described Passion – Sources as "essentially a series of footnotes to the main text [the Passion soundtrack], academically researched and reverentially presented." Romney praised the tracks by percussion group Fatala and violinist Shankar but contended that, while the music throughout Sources is good, "somehow the whole doesn't invite reaction." The Age critic Carlos Caminito considered it better than Passion, describing it as a collection of traditional pieces of Asian, African and Middle-Eastern origin which, while favouring drums and percussion, also contains Kudsi Erguner's "haunting" Turkish flute and "the hectic 'Tej Beit' Ethiopian bar song recorded on location."

Daniel Feist of The Gazette considered the compilation to be "thoroughly traditional" in scope and "a unique and diverse musical travelogue." While noting the general uplifting feel of the material, Feist felt that many tracks would prove "difficult listening" for listeners unaccustomed to the unfamiliar scales, subtle and complex rhythms, and use of rababa, mazhar and doudouk, but added that "patience and an open mind will surely prove rewarding." The Daily Gleaner named it a sampler of African, Indian and Middle Eastern music that provides "an attractive next step" after Gabriel's Passion, adding: "It's less tempered than Passion – sometimes even raw and demanding – but still an engaging record rich in strange and exotic delights."

Retrospectively, Stewart Mason of AllMusic deemed Passion – Sources to be far superior to Passion, commenting that, by presenting the original performances that inspired the latter album, Sources "is both a handy second step for those intrigued by the soundtrack and an entertaining collection for the more experienced world music fan." Mason also commented on the compilation's significance, calling it "in most ways an exemplary collection that did much to launch Real World as one of the most viable high-profile world music labels in the world." Trouser Press note how the album contains a selection of the field recordings made by Gabriel of musicians of Egyptian, Moroccan, Senegalese and Turkish origin which he then used as the basis for material on Passion.

== Legacy ==
Mason has noted that some "purists" criticized aspects of the compilation, including the shortening of some tracks, occasional new overdubs courtesy of Gabriel's collaborators (including the new addition of Manu Katche's percussion on "an otherwise enchanting Moroccan wedding song"), and the "fairly dire piece of Indian pop music by Shankar & the Epidemics". However, Mason believed most listeners will find these to be "only minor annoyances." In a 1992 interview, former Bauhaus frontman Peter Murphy described Passion – Sources as his favourite album, calling it "a collection of ethnic music" used by Gabriel for his Passion soundtrack. The Observer have categorised it as "a compendium of Islamic and Middle Eastern music."

The positive feedback that Gabriel received regarding Passion – Sources encouraged him to release a similar companion album to his next pop album, Us (1992); entitled Plus from Us and released in 1993, it contains some of the music that influenced Us and solo works from contributors to the record. In 1993, Roger Catlin of The Hartford Courant wrote "there hasn't really been anything in pop music" like Passion – Sources and Plus From Us.

== Track listing ==
No.	Title	Writer(s)	Performer (Country of Origin)	Length
1.	"Shamus-Ud-Doha Bader-Ud-Doja"	Nusrat Fateh Ali Khan	Nusrat Fateh Ali Khan & Party (Pakistan)	4:59
2.	"Call to Prayer"	Traditional	Baaba Maal (Senegal)	3:51
3.	"Sankarabaranam Pancha Nadai Pallavi"	Shankar	Shankar and the Epidemics (India)	5:01
4.	"Ulvi"	Kudsi Erguner	Kudsi Erguner (Turkey)	1:33
5.	"Fallahi"	Traditional	Hossam Ramzy (Egypt)	2:56
6.	"Sabahiya"	Traditional	Banga (Tanta-Suaag) (Egypt)	2:19
7.	"Tejbeit (Ethiopian Bar Song)"	Traditional	Unknown musicians (Ethiopia)	2:43
8.	"Prelude in Tchahargah"	Traditional	Mahmoud Tabrizi Zadeh (Iran)	3:10
9.	"Wedding Song"	Traditional	Unknown musicians (Morocco)	2:42
10.	"Magdelene's House"	Abdul Aziz el-Sayed	Abdul Aziz el-Sayed (Iran)	2:48
11.	"Yoky"	Traditional	Fatala (Guinea)	2:02
12.	"Ya Sah"	Traditional	Nass El Ghiwane (Morocco)	2:17
13.	"Al Nahla Al 'Ali"	Metqal Qenawi Metqal and Yunis Al Hilali	Les Musiciens du Nil (Egypt)	2:55
14.	"Song of Complaint"	Traditional	Antranik Askarian and Khatchadour Khatchaturian (Armenia)	3:02

== Personnel ==
=== Musicians ===
- Dildar Hussain – tabla (1)
- Farrukh Fateh Ali Khan – harmonium (1), vocals (1)
- Asad Ali Khan – chorus (1)
- Atta Fareed – chorus (1)
- Ghulam Fareed – chorus (1)
- Mohammad Maskeen – chorus (1)
- Iqbal Naqbi – chorus (1)
- Kaukab Ali – pupil singer (1)
- Mujhid Mubarik Ali Khan – senior singer (1)
- Nusrat Fateh Ali Khan – main vocals (1)
- Shankar – double violin (2, 3), production (3)
- Baaba Maal – vocals (2)
- Peter Gabriel – arrangement (2), production (2, 7, 9–11, 14), compilation, track notes
- Zakir Hussain – tabla (3)
- Vikku Vinayakram – ghatam (3)
- Caroline – Tanbura (3)
- Kudsi Erguner – ney flute (4), production (4)
- Hossam Ramzy – tabla (5), duf (5), doholla (5), tambourine (5), production (5), additional percussion (7, 9)
- Joseph Alexander – mazhar (5)
- Richard Evans – tin whistle (7), mixing (1)
- Mahmoud Tabrizi Zadeh – kementché (8), production (8)
- Manu Katché – additional percussion (9)
- Abdul Aziz el-Sayed – kanoun (10)
- Yacouba (Bruno) Camara – conga (11), gongoma (11), arrangement (11)
- Arafan Toure – djembe (11)
- Aly Camara – djembe (11), bolon (11)
- Amara Soumah – doum-doum (11), gongoma (11)
- Naby 'Papus' Camara – small percussion (11)
- Kabine Camara – small percussion (11)
- Tagar – small percussion (11)
- Nass El Ghiwane – production (12)
- Mustafa Abdel Aziz – tabla (13)
- Said Mohammad Aly – tabla (13)
- Metqal Qenawi Metqal – rababa (13)
- Shamandi Tewfick Metqal – rababa (13)
- Mohammad Murad Metgali – rababa (13)
- Alain Weber – rababa (13)
- Les Musiciens du Nil – production (13)
- Antranik Askarian – doudouk (14)
- Khatchadour Khatchaturian – doudouk (14)

=== Technical personnel ===
- Mohammed Ayuub – production (1)
- David Bottrill – engineering (1, 2, 10, 11, 13), compilation assistance
- Alan Heaton – recording (5)
- David Knowles – recording (5)
- Tiberiu Alexandru – production (6)
- Ralph Harrison – recording (7)
- Ragnar Johnson – recording (7)
- Robert Ataian – production (14)
- The Townhouse – mastering

== Charts ==
Chart (1990)	Peak position
US World Albums	7
