= Chroniques blanches =

- Directed by: Mohamed Abdelkrim Derkaoui
- Written by: Ouahid Noureddine, Abdelkrim Derkaoui
- Starring: Mourad Zaoui, Karim Saidi, Laila Hadioui
- Cinematography: Kamal Derkaoui
- Edited by: Julien Fouré
- Music by: Michy Mano
- Release date: 2009
- Running time: 83 minutes
- Country: Morocco
- Language: Moroccan Arabic

Chroniques blanches (English: White Chronicles) is a 2009 Moroccan film directed by Abdelkrim Derkaoui. It was screened at the National Film Festival.

== Cast ==
- Mourad Zaoui
- Karim Saidi
- Laila Hadioui
- Hatim Idar
- Ahmed Jaidi
- Mustapha Zaari
- Mohammed Nouaimane
- Nabila Kilani
- Ahmed Reddani
- Hamid Najah
