= World Cinema Project =

Non-profit organization

The World Cinema Project (WCP), formerly World Cinema Foundation, is a non-profit organization devoted to the preservation and restoration of neglected world cinema, founded by Martin Scorsese.

== History ==
Founded in 2007 as the World Cinema Foundation by American filmmaker Martin Scorsese, it was inspired by the work of The Film Foundation in the United States, a similar venture which Scorsese founded with George Lucas, Francis Ford Coppola, Stanley Kubrick, Steven Spielberg and Clint Eastwood in 1990.

Trances, a music documentary about Nass El Ghiwane an influential Moroccan music group, was picked by Martin Scorsese as the inaugural release for the foundation; it was screened at the Cannes Film Festival in 2007 and at Djemaa el-Fna square in Morocco.

=== Description and governance ===
The World Cinema Foundation is backed by an advisory board "Filmmaker Council", originally including Martin Scorsese, Fatih Akin, Souleymane Cissé, Guillermo del Toro, Stephen Frears, Alejandro González Iñárritu, Wong Kar-Wai, Abbas Kiarostami, Deepa Mehta, Ermanno Olmi, Raoul Peck, Cristi Puiu, Walter Salles, Abderrahmane Sissako, Elia Suleiman, Bertrand Tavernier, Wim Wenders, and Tian Zhuangzhuang.

After leaving his position at the Film Society of Lincoln Center, Kent Jones became the foundation's executive director.

== List of restored films ==
Year	English title	Original title	Director(s)	Production country
1931	Limite		Mário Peixoto	Brazil (Note: Included in the Criterion Collection WCP No. 2 Boxset)
1934	The Phantom of the Monastery	El fantasma del convento	Fernando de Fuentes	Mexico
1934	Two Monks	Dos monjes	Juan Bustillo Oro	Mexico (Note: Included in the Criterion Collection WCP No. 3 Boxset)
1936	Redes		Emilio Gómez Muriel and Fred Zinnemann	Mexico (Note: Included in the Criterion Collection WCP No. 1 Boxset)
1939	Two Girls on the Street	Két lány az utcán	Andre de Toth	Hungary (Note: Included in the Criterion Collection WCP No. 4 Boxset)
1939	Prisoners of the Earth	Prisioneros de la tierra	Mario Soffici	Argentina
1946	Enamorada		Emilio Fernández	Mexico
1948	Kalpana		Uday Shankar	India
1950	The Forgotten Ones	Los Olvidados	Luis Buñuel	Mexico
1953	Él		Luis Buñuel	Mexico
1954	After the Curfew	Lewat Djam Malam	Usmar Ismail	Indonesia
1960	The Cloud-Capped Star	মেঘে ঢাকা তারা	Ritwik Ghatak	India
1960	The Housemaid	하녀	Kim Ki-young	South Korea
1960	Macario		Roberto Gavaldón	Mexico
1963	Borom Sarret	Le Charretier	Ousmane Sembène	Senegal
1964	Dry Summer	Susuz Yaz	Metin Erksan	Turkey
1965	São Paulo, Incorporated	São Paulo, Sociedade Anônima	Luis Sérgio Person	Brazil
1966	Black Girl	La noire de...	Ousmane Sembène	Senegal, France
1966	Law of the Border	Hudutların Kanunu	Lütfi Ömer Akad	Turkey
1966	Raid into Tibet		Adrian Cowell	United Kingdom
1968	Lucía		Humberto Solás	Cuba
1968	Memories of Underdevelopment	Memorias del Subdesarrollo	Tomás Gutiérrez Alea	Cuba
1969	The Color of Pomegranates	Նռան գույնը	Sergei Parajanov	Soviet Union
1969	Contras'city		Djibril Diop Mambéty	Senegal
1969	The Eloquent Peasant	الفلاح الفصيح	Shadi Abdel Salam	Egypt
1969	The Night of Counting the Years	المومياء	Shadi Abdel Salam	Egypt
1969	The Woman with the Knife	La femme au couteau	Timité Bassori	Côte d'Ivoire
1970	Badou Boy		Djibril Diop Mambéty	Senegal
1970	Days and Nights in the Forest	Aranyer Din Ratri	Satyajit Ray	India
1970	Soleil Ô		Med Hondo	Mauritania, France
1970	The Treasure	Nidhanaya	Lester James Peries	Sri Lanka
1972	Downpour	رگبار	Bahram Beyzai	Iran
1972	Eight Deadly Shots	Kahdeksan surmanluotia	Mikko Niskanen	Finland
1972	Sambizanga		Sarah Maldoror	Angola, France, Congo
1973	The Dupes	المخدوعون	Tewfik Saleh	Syria
1973	A River Called Titas	Titash Ekti Nadir Naam	Ritwik Ghatak	India, Bangladesh
1973	Touki Bouki		Djibril Diop Mambéty	Senegal
1974	The Stranger and the Fog	غریبه و مه	Bahram Beyzai	Iran
1975	Chronicle of the Years of Fire	وقائع سنين الجمر	Mohammed Lakhdar-Hamina	Algeria (Note: Included in the Criterion Collection WCP No. 5 Boxset)
1975	Manila in the Claws of Light	Maynila, sa mga Kuko ng Liwanag	Lino Brocka	Philippines
1975	Muna Moto		Jean-Pierre Dikongué Pipa	Cameroon
1976	Chess of the Wind	شطرنج باد	Mohammad Reza Aslani	Iran
1976	Insiang		Lino Brocka	Philippines
1978	Alyam, Alyam	Alyam Alyam O les jours	Ahmed El Maanouni	Morocco
1978	Thampu		G. Aravindan	India
1979	Kummatty	കുമ്മാട്ടി	G. Aravindan	India
1980	Pixote		Héctor Babenco	Brazil
1981	Trances	الحال	Ahmed El Maanouni	Morocco
1983	The Boys from Fengkuei	風櫃來的人	Hou Hsiao-hsien	Taiwan
1985	Taipei Story	青梅竹馬	Edward Yang	Taiwan
1986	The Choice	Yam Daabo	Idrissa Ouédraogo	Burkina Faso, France
1988	Camp de Thiaroye		Ousmane Sembène and Thierno Faty Sow	Senegal, Algeria, Tunisia
1989	Revenge	Месть	Yermek Shinarbayev	Soviet Union
1990	Lumumba: Death of a Prophet	Lumumba, la mort d'un prophète	Raoul Peck	Democratic Republic of the Congo
1991	A Brighter Summer Day	牯嶺街少年殺人事件	Edward Yang	Taiwan
1991	The Fall of Otrar	Отырардың күйреуі	Ardak Amirkulov	Kazakhstan
1997	Xiao Wu	小武	Jia Zhangke	China
2000	Mysterious Object at Noon	ดอกฟ้าในมือมาร	Apichatpong Weerasethakul	Thailand

== Upcoming restorations ==
Year	English title	Original title	Director(s)	Production Country
1967	The Winds of the Aures	ريح الاوراس	Mohammed Lakhdar-Hamina	Algeria
1985	Faces of Women	Visages de femmes	Desiré Ecaré	Côte d'Ivoire
