= Fahrenheit 9/11 =

2004 documentary film by Michael Moore

- Theatrical release poster
- Directed by: Michael Moore
- Written by: Michael Moore
- Produced by: Michael Moore; Jim Czarnecki; Kathleen Glynn; Monica Hampton; Harvey Weinstein; Bob Weinstein
- Starring: Michael Moore; George W. Bush; Donald Rumsfeld
- Narrated by: Michael Moore
- Production companies: Dog Eat Dog Films; Fellowship Adventure Group
- Distributed by: Lions Gate Films; IFC Films
- Release dates: May 17, 2004 (Cannes); June 25, 2004 (United States)
- Running time: 122 minutes
- Country: United States
- Languages: English; Arabic
- Budget: $6 million
- Box office: $222.4 million

Fahrenheit 9/11 is a 2004 American documentary film directed, written by, and starring Michael Moore. The subjects of the film are the presidency of George W. Bush, the Iraq War, and the media's coverage of the war. In the film, Moore states that American corporate media were cheerleaders for the 2003 invasion of Iraq, and did not provide an accurate or objective analysis of the rationale for the war and the resulting casualties there.

The title of the film alludes to Ray Bradbury's 1953 novel Fahrenheit 451, a dystopian view of the future United States, drawing an analogy between the autoignition temperature of paper and the date of the September 11 attacks; one of the film's taglines was "The Temperature at Which Freedom Burns".

The film debuted at the 2004 Cannes Film Festival, where it was awarded the Palme d'Or, the festival's highest award. It received generally positive reviews from critics, but it also generated intense controversy, particularly including disputes over its accuracy. The film became the highest-grossing documentary of all time, grossing over $220 million (although it was later surpassed by Michael Jackson's This Is It in 2009). A follow-up, titled Fahrenheit 11/9, about the first presidency of Donald Trump, was released in September 2018.

== Synopsis ==
The documentary begins by suggesting that friends and political allies of George W. Bush at Fox News Channel tilted the election of 2000 by prematurely declaring Bush the winner. It then suggests that the handling of the voting controversy in Florida constituted election fraud.

The documentary then segues into the September 11 attacks of 2001. Moore says that Bush was informed of the first plane hitting the World Trade Center on his way to an elementary school in Florida. Bush is then shown sitting in an Emma E. Booker Elementary School classroom with children. When told that a second plane has crashed into the World Trade Center and that the nation is "under attack", Bush allows the students to finish their book-reading, and Moore notes that he continued reading The Pet Goat for nearly seven minutes.

Moore then discusses the tangled relationships among the U.S. government and the Bush family, the bin Laden family, the Saudi Arabian government, and the Taliban, which span over three decades. Moore then states that the United States Government had evacuated 24 members of the bin Laden family on a secret flight shortly after the attacks, without subjecting them to any form of interrogation.

Moore moves on to examine George W. Bush's Texas Air National Guard service record. Moore contends that Bush's dry-hole-oil-well attempts were partially funded by the Saudis and by the bin Laden family through the intermediation of James R. Bath, whose name is shown to have been blacked out from Bush's records. Moore alleges that these conflicts of interest suggest that the Bush administration does not serve in the interests of Americans. The movie continues by suggesting ulterior motives for the War in Afghanistan, including a natural gas pipeline through Afghanistan to the Indian Ocean.

Moore suggests that the Bush administration induced a climate of fear among the American population through the mass media. Moore then describes purported anti-terror efforts, including government infiltration of pacifist groups and other events, and the signing of the USA PATRIOT Act.

The documentary then turns to the subject of the Iraq War, comparing the lives of Iraqis before and after the invasion. The citizens of Iraq are portrayed as living relatively happy lives prior to the country's invasion by the U.S. Armed Forces. The film also takes pains to depict war cheerleading in the U.S. media and the general bias of journalists, with quotes from news organizations and embedded journalists. Moore suggests that atrocities will occur in Iraq and shows footage depicting U.S. abuse of prisoners.

Later in the film, Lila Lipscomb appears with her family after hearing of the death of her son, Sgt. Michael Pedersen, who was killed on April 2, 2003, in Karbala. Anguished and tearful, she questions the purpose of the war.

Tying together several themes and points, Moore thanks those serving in the U.S. military. He claims that the working class of America are always the first to join the Army, while people of higher class display less such readiness. He states that those valuable citizens should not be sent to risk their lives unless it is truly necessary to defend America. The credits roll while Neil Young's "Rockin' in the Free World" plays. (Moore had originally intended to use The Who's "Won't Get Fooled Again" but was denied permission by Pete Townshend).

Moore dedicated the film to his friend who died in the World Trade Center attacks and to those servicemen and women from Flint, Michigan, who died in Iraq: "Michael Pedersen, Brett Petriken, and all the men and women from the Flint Area who have died in the Iraq War ... Bill Weems and the 2,973 who died on 9/11/01 ... and the countless thousands who have died in Afghanistan and Iraq as a result of our actions."

== Production ==
Originally planned to be financed by Mel Gibson's Icon Productions (which planned to give Michael Moore eight figures in upfront cash and potential backend), Fahrenheit 9/11 was later picked up by Miramax Films and Wild Bunch in May 2003 after Icon Productions had abruptly dropped the financing deal it made. Miramax had earlier distributed another film for Moore, The Big One, in 1997.

At that time, Disney was the parent company of Miramax. According to the book DisneyWar, Disney executives did not know that Miramax agreed to finance the film until they saw a posting on the Drudge Report. Michael Eisner (the CEO of Disney at that time) called Harvey Weinstein (co-chairman of Miramax at that time) and ordered him to drop the film. In addition, Disney sent two letters to Weinstein demanding Miramax drop the film. Weinstein felt Disney had no right to block the releasing of Fahrenheit 9/11 since the film's $6 million budget was well below the level at which Miramax needed to seek Disney's approval, and it would not be rated NC-17. But Weinstein was in contract negotiations with Disney, so he offered a compromise that he would drop the film if Disney did not like it. Disney responded by having Peter Murphy send Weinstein a letter stating that the film's $6 million budget was only a bridge financing and Miramax would sell off its interest in the movie to get those $6 million back; according to the same letter, Miramax was also expected to publicly state that it would not release the film.

After Fahrenheit 9/11 was nearly finished, Miramax held several preview screenings; they were "testing through the roof". Weinstein informed Eisner that Fahrenheit 9/11 was finished, and Eisner was surprised by the fact that Miramax had continued making the film. Weinstein asked several Disney executives (including Eisner) to watch the film, but all declined; Disney stated again that Miramax would not release the film, and Disney also accused Weinstein of hiding Fahrenheit 9/11 by keeping it off production reports. Disney sent production vice President Brad Epstein to watch Fahrenheit 9/11 on April 24, 2004. According to Weinstein, Epstein said he liked the film; but according to the report Epstein sent to the Walt Disney Company board of directors, Epstein explicitly criticized it. Eisner told Weinstein that Disney's board had decided not to allow Miramax to release the film. Weinstein was furious and he asked George J. Mitchell (chairman of Disney at that time) to see the film, but Mitchell declined. Weinstein asked lawyer David Boies to help find a solution; the Weinsteins and Moore had also hired Chris Lehane to consult on the film's release strategies. Lehane suggested to reveal Disney's decision to The New York Times.

The New York Times reported about Disney's decision on May 5, 2004. Disney stated that both Moore's agent (Ari Emanuel) and Miramax were advised in May 2003 that Miramax would not be permitted to distribute the film. Disney representatives said Disney had the right to veto any Miramax film if it appeared that its distribution would be counterproductive to the interests of the company; indeed, Disney had blocked Miramax from releasing two films before: Kids and Dogma.

Because of these difficulties, distribution was first secured in numerous countries outside the U.S. On May 28, 2004, after more than a week of talks, Disney announced that Miramax film studio founders Harvey and Bob Weinstein had personally acquired the rights to the documentary after Disney declined to distribute it. The Weinsteins agreed to repay Disney for all costs to that point, estimated at $6 million. They also agreed to be responsible for all costs to finish the film and all marketing costs not paid by any third-party film distributors. A settlement between the Weinsteins and Disney was also reached so that 60% of the film's profit would be donated to charity.

The Weinsteins established Fellowship Adventure Group to handle the distribution of this film. Fellowship Adventure Group joined forces with Lions Gate Entertainment (which had released two other Miramax-financed films O and Dogma) and IFC Films to release it in the United States theatrically. (Fellowship Adventure Group also handled the film's U.S. home video distribution through Columbia TriStar Home Entertainment). Moore stated that he was "grateful to them now that everyone who wants to see it will now have the chance to do so.

After being informed that the film had been given an R rating by the Motion Picture Association of America (MPAA), Moore appealed the decision, hoping to obtain a PG-13 rating instead. Moore's lawyer, former Governor of New York, Mario Cuomo, was not allowed to attend the hearing. The appeal was denied on June 22, 2004, and Cuomo contended that it was because he had been banned from the hearing. Some theaters chose to defy the MPAA and allow unchaperoned teenagers to attend screenings.

== Release ==
Alternate Fahrenheit 9/11 poster

The film was released theatrically by The Fellowship Adventure Group through a distribution arrangement with Lions Gate Entertainment. On the opening weekend of June 25–27, 2004, the film generated box-office revenues of $23.9 million in the United States and Canada, making it the weekend's top-grossing film. Its opening weekend earned more than the entire U.S. theatrical run of any other feature-length documentary (including Moore's previous film, Bowling for Columbine). The film released in the United Kingdom on July 2, 2004, and in France on July 7, 2004.

Moore has credited part of the theatrical success to the efforts of conservative groups to pressure theaters not to run the film, conjecturing that these efforts backfired by creating publicity. There were also efforts by liberal groups such as MoveOn.org encouraging attendance, in order to defy their political opponents' contrary efforts.

Fahrenheit 9/11 was screened in a number of Middle Eastern countries, including the United Arab Emirates, Lebanon, and Egypt, but was immediately banned in Kuwait. "We have a law that prohibits insulting friendly nations", said Abdul-Aziz Bou Dastour of the Kuwaiti Information Ministry. The film was not shown in Saudi Arabia as public movie theaters were not permitted from 1983 until 2017. The Saudi ruling elite subsequently launched an advertising campaign spanning nineteen U.S. cities to counter criticism partly raised in the film. Democratic members of the Coalition Provisional Authority in U.S.-occupied Iraq had the film screened at the Republican Palace in Baghdad.

In Cuba, bootlegged versions of the film were shown in 120 theaters, followed by a prime-time television broadcast by the leading state-run network. It had been widely reported that this might affect its Oscar eligibility, since the film was broadcast on television less than nine months after its theatrical release. However, soon after that story had been published, the Academy of Motion Picture Arts and Sciences issued a statement denying this, saying, "If it was pirated or stolen or unauthorized we would not blame the producer or distributor for that". In addition, Wild Bunch, the film's overseas distributor for Cuba, issued a statement denying a television deal had been struck with Cuban Television. The issue became moot when Moore decided to forgo Oscar eligibility, in favor of a pay-per-view televising of the film on November 1, 2004.

=== Critical reception ===
The film was received positively by critics. Review aggregator website Rotten Tomatoes reports an approval rating of 82% based on 235 reviews, with an average rating of 7.5/10. The site's critics' consensus reads: "Extremely one-sided in its indictment of the Bush administration, but worth watching for the humor and the debates it'll stir." It also received a score of 67 on Metacritic, based on 43 critics, indicating "generally favorable" reviews.

Film critic Roger Ebert, who gave the documentary three and a half stars out of four, said that the film "is less an exposé of George W. Bush than a dramatization of what Moore sees as a failed and dangerous presidency", adding: "Moore brings a fresh impact to familiar material by the way he marshals his images".

Joe Morgenstern of The Wall Street Journal described the film as "rambling, troubling and sometimes rousing", and wrote: "At its best, "Fahrenheit 9/11" is an impressionist burlesque of contemporary American politics that culminates in a somber lament for lives lost in Iraq. But the good stuff—and there's some extremely good stuff—keeps getting tainted by Mr. Moore's poison-camera penchant for drawing dark inferences from dubious evidence."

Entertainment Weekly put it on its end-of-the-decade, "best-of" list, saying, "Michael Moore's anti-Bush polemic gave millions of frustrated liberals exactly what they needed to hear in 2004—and infuriated just about everyone else. Along the way, it became the highest-grossing documentary of all time."

=== Commercial performance ===
Grossing over $222 million total worldwide, the film is the highest grossing documentary of all time according to Box Office Mojo, and was recognized by Guinness World Records as the third highest-grossing documentary ever. The film had a general release in the United States and Canada on June 23, 2004. It has since been released in 42 more countries. On Al-Jazeera in August 2012, Moore claimed that the movie "grossed about half a billion dollars" worldwide. It was the highest-grossing film released by Lionsgate until it was surpassed by The Hunger Games in 2012.

=== Home media ===
Fahrenheit 9/11 was released to DVD and VHS on October 5, 2004, an unusually short turnaround time after theatrical release. In the first days of the release, the film broke records for the highest-selling documentary ever. About two million copies were sold on the first day, most of which (1.4 million) were sold as rentals.

A companion book, The Official Fahrenheit 9/11 Reader, was released at the same time. It contains the complete screenplay, documentation of Moore's sources, audience e-mails about the film, film reviews, and articles.

=== Initial television presentations ===
The two-hour film was planned to be shown as part of the three-hour "The Michael Moore Pre-Election Special" on iN DEMAND, but iN DEMAND backed out in mid-October. Moore later arranged for simultaneous broadcasts on November 1, 2004, at 8:00 p.m. (EST) on Dish Network, TVN, and the Cinema Now website and material prepared for "The Michael Moore Pre-Election Special" was incorporated into "Fahrenheit 9/11: A Movement in Time", which aired that same week on The Independent Film Channel.

The movie was also shown on basic cable television in Germany and Austria on November 1, 2004, and November 2, 2004. In the UK, the film was shown on Channel 4 on January 27, 2005. In Hungary, it was shown on RTL Klub, a commercial channel, on September 10, 2005, on m1, one of the national channels, on August 13, 2006, on m2, the other national channel, on September 1, 2006. In Denmark, it was shown on Danmarks Radio (normally referred to as just DR), which is Denmark's national broadcasting corporation, on April 11, 2006. In Norway, it was shown on NRK, the national broadcasting corporation, on August 27, 2006. The film was screened in New Zealand on September 9, 2006, on TV ONE, a channel of TVNZ. The next day, the Dutch network Nederland 3 aired the film. In Belgium, it was shown on Kanaal 2 on October 12, 2006. In Brazil, it aired on October 10, 2008, on TV Cultura, the São Paulo public broadcasting network.

== Soundtrack ==
Fahrenheit 9/11: Original Soundtrack

Soundtrack album by Various artists
- Released: October 5, 2004
- Length: 1:00:44
- Label: Rhino

Professional ratings
Review scores
Source	Rating
AllMusic	3/5 stars

The soundtrack to Fahrenheit 9/11 was released on October 5, 2004, by Rhino Entertainment.

=== Track listing ===
No.	Title	Artist	Length
1.	"The Un-President"	Jeff Gibbs	3:32
2.	"Vacation"	The Go-Go's	3:00
3.	"Bush Waits...and Waits"	Jeff Gibbs	2:14
4.	"Cantus in Memory of Benjamin Britten, For String Orchestra & Bell"	Paavo Järvi and Estonian National Symphony Orchestra	6:41
5.	"We Gotta Get out of This Place"	Eric Burdon	4:08
6.	"Weapons of Deceit"	Jeff Gibbs	2:18
7.	"Deserter"	Jeff Gibbs	4:08
8.	"Cocaine"	J. J. Cale	2:49
9.	"Shiny Happy People"	R.E.M.	3:44
10.	"Magnificent Seven Theme"	Elmer Bernstein	2:00
11.	"Afghan Victory Dance"	Jeff Gibbs	3:16
12.	"Fire Water Burn"	Bloodhound Gang	4:53
13.	"The Greatest American Hero (Believe It or Not)"	Joey Scarbury	3:14
14.	"Aqualung"	Jethro Tull	6:35
15.	"All They Ask"	Jeff Gibbs	3:30
16.	"Rockin' in the Free World"	Neil Young	4:42
Total length:			1:00:44

== Awards ==
=== Palme d'Or ===
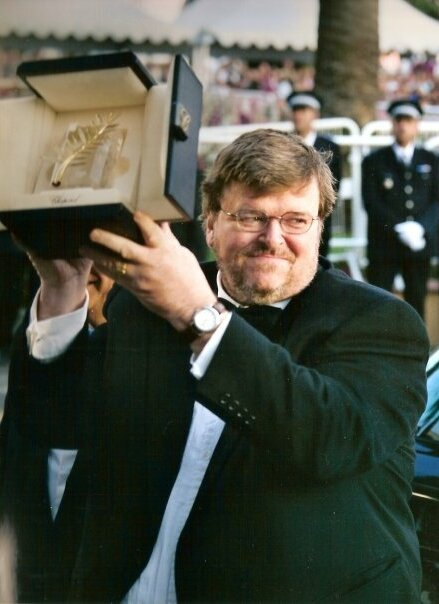
Michael Moore receiving the Palme d'Or at the 2004 Cannes Film Festival

In April 2004, the film was selected to compete for the Palme d'Or at the 57th Cannes Film Festival. After its first showing in Cannes in May 2004, the film received a 15–20 minute standing ovation; Harvey Weinstein, whose Miramax Films funded the film, said, "It was the longest standing ovation I've seen in over 25 years".

On May 22, 2004, the film was awarded the Palme d'Or. It was the first documentary to win that award since Jacques Cousteau's and Louis Malle's The Silent World in 1956. Just as his much publicized Oscar acceptance speech, Moore's speech in Cannes included some political statements:

I have a sneaking suspicion that what you have done here and the response from everyone at the festival, you will assure that the American people will see this film. I can't thank you enough for that. You've put a huge light on this and many people want the truth and many want to put it in the closet, just walk away. There was a great Republican president who once said, if you just give the people the truth, the Republicans, the Americans will be saved. […] I dedicate this Palme d'Or to my daughter, to the children of Americans and to Iraq and to all those in the world who suffer from our actions.

Some conservatives in the United States, such as Jon Alvarez of FireHollywood, commented that such an award could be expected from the French. Moore had remarked only days earlier that: "I fully expect the Fox News Channel and other right-wing media to portray this as an award from the French. […] There was only one French citizen on the jury. Four out of nine were American. […] This is not a French award, it was given by an international jury dominated by Americans." The jury was made up of four North Americans, four Europeans, and one Asian.

Responding to suggestions that the award was political, Moore said: "Quentin [Tarantino] whispered in my ear, 'We want you to know that it was not the politics of your film that won you this award. We are not here to give a political award. Some of us have no politics. We awarded the art of cinema, that is what won you this award and we wanted you to know that as a fellow filmmaker.'" In comments to the prize-winning jury in 2005, Cannes director Gilles Jacob said that panels should make their decision based on filmmaking rather than politics. He expressed his opinion that though Moore's talent was not in doubt, "it was a question of a satirical tract that was awarded a prize more for political than cinematographic reasons, no matter what the jury said". Interviewed about the decision four years later, Tarantino responded: "As time has gone on, I have put that decision under a microscope and I still think we were right. That was a movie of the moment – Fahrenheit 9/11 may not play the same way now as it did then, but back then it deserved everything it got."

=== People's Choice Award ===
The film won additional awards after its release, such as the People's Choice Award for Favorite Motion Picture, an unprecedented honor for a documentary.

=== Golden Raspberry Awards ===
Nine months after Fahrenheit 9/11 received the Palme d'Or, George W. Bush, Donald Rumsfeld, and Condoleezza Rice won the Worst Actor, Worst Supporting Actor, and Worst Screen Couple (Bush/Rice) at the 25th Golden Raspberry Awards ("Razzies") because of their mishandling of the 9/11 attacks and the Iraq War. Britney Spears, who appeared in the film in a pre-recorded interview where she expressed her support for Bush, won the Golden Raspberry for Worst Supporting Actress.

== Controversies ==
The film generated criticism and controversy after its release shortly before the 2004 United States presidential election. British-American journalist Christopher Hitchens contended that Fahrenheit 9/11 contains distortions and untruths. This drew several rebuttals, including an eFilmCritic article and a Columbus Free Press editorial. Former Democratic mayor of New York City Ed Koch, who had endorsed President Bush for re-election, called the film propaganda "for its many blatant lies".

== Moore's expectations for the 2004 presidential election ==
The film was released in June 2004, less than five months before the 2004 presidential election. Michael Moore, while not endorsing presidential candidate John Kerry, stated in interviews that he hoped "to see Mr. Bush removed from the White House". He also said that he hoped his film would influence the election: "This may be the first time a film has this kind of impact". However, some political analysts did not expect it to have a significant effect on the election. One Republican strategist stated that Moore "communicates to that far-left sliver that would never vote for Bush", and Jack Pitney, a government professor at Claremont McKenna College, suspected that the main effect of the film would be to "turn Bush-haters into bigger Bush-haters". Regardless of whether the film would change the minds of many voters, Moore stated his intention to use it as an organizing tool, and hoped that it would energize those who wanted to see Bush defeated in 2004, increasing voter turnout. Notwithstanding the film's influence and commercial success, George W. Bush was re-elected in 2004.

Because Moore had opted to have it played on television prior to the 2004 election, the film was ruled ineligible to compete for the Best Documentary Feature in the Academy Awards.

== Lawsuit ==
In February 2011, Moore sued producers Bob and Harvey Weinstein for US$2.7 million in unpaid profits from the film, stating that they used "Hollywood accounting tricks" to avoid paying him the money. They responded that Moore had received US$20 million for the film and that "his claims are hogwash". Eventually, Bob and Harvey Weinstein reached a settlement with Moore for undisclosed amounts and terms.

== Subsequent film ==
On September 6, 2018, Moore released a film entitled Fahrenheit 11/9 about the 2016 United States presidential election and the subsequent presidency of Donald Trump. The title is reference to the original film, with the date 9/11 being reversed to 11/9.
