= Bob Iger =

American media executive (born 1951)

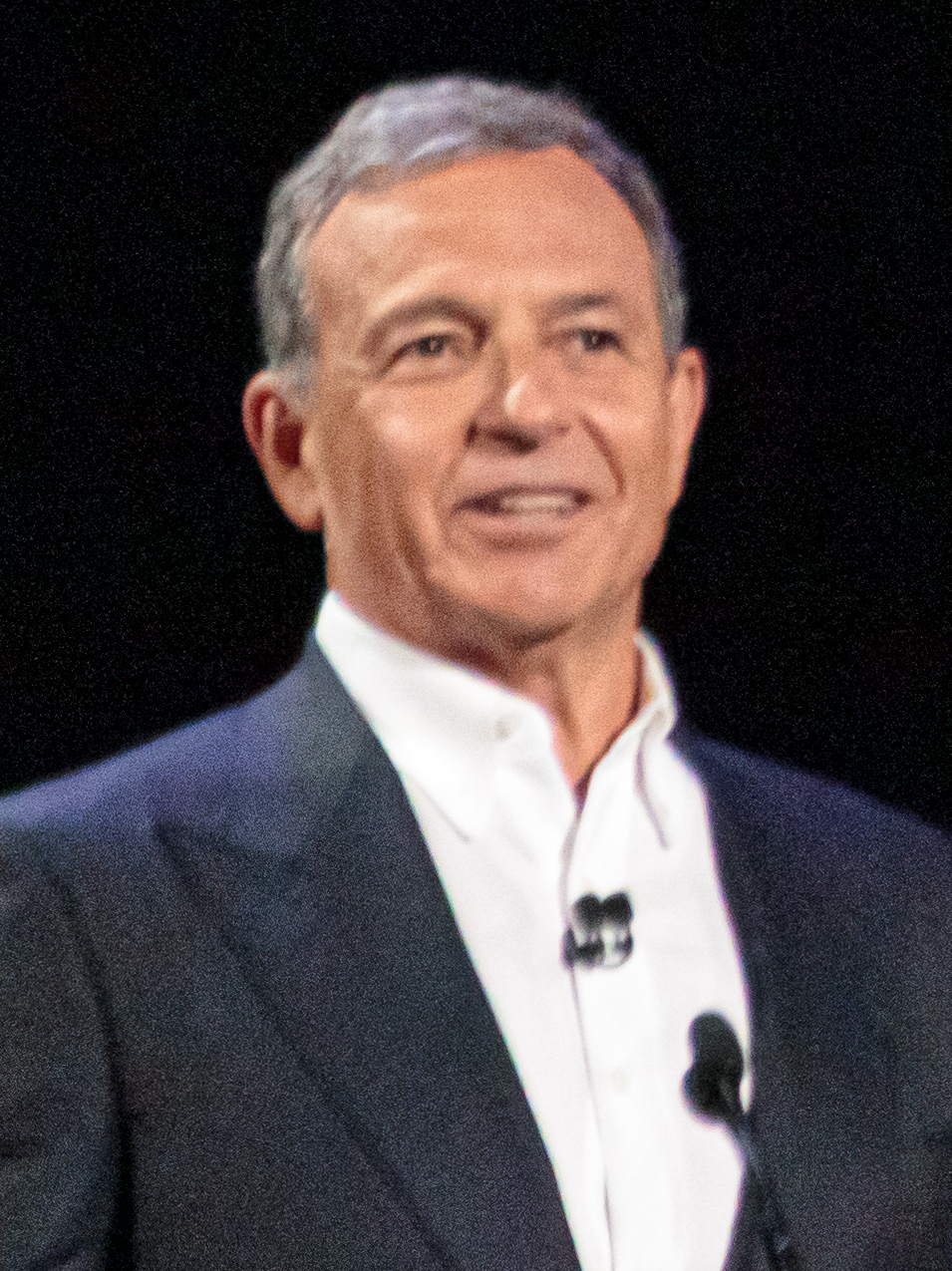
- Iger in 2019
- Born: Robert Alan Iger; February 10, 1951 (age 75); New York City, US
- Education: Ithaca College (BS)
- Occupation: Media executive
- Years active: 1972–present
- Title: President of The Walt Disney Company (2000–2012); Chairman of The Walt Disney Company (2012–2021); CEO of The Walt Disney Company (2005–2020, 2022–2026)
- Term: January 24, 2000 – 2012 (President); March 2012 – 2021 (Chairman); October 1, 2005 – February 25, 2020, November 20, 2022 – March 18, 2026 (CEO)
- Predecessor: Michael Eisner; John E. Pepper Jr.
- Successor: Bob Chapek; Josh D'Amaro
- Political party: Independent (2016–present)
- Other political affiliations: Democratic (previously)
- Board member of: Apple Inc. (2011–2019); Perfect Day (2020–present); Genies, Inc. (2022–present)
- Spouses: Susan Iger (m. 1977; div. 1994) Willow Bay (m. 1995)
- Children: 4
- Relatives: Jerry Iger (great-uncle)
- Awards: Disney Legends

Robert Alan Iger (/ˈaɪɡər/; born February 10, 1951) is an American media executive who was the chief executive officer (CEO) of the Walt Disney Company twice, from 2005 to 2020 and from 2022 to 2026. He previously was the president of the American Broadcasting Company (ABC) between 1994 and 1995 and president and chief operating officer (COO) of Capital Cities/ABC, from 1995 until its acquisition by Disney in 1996.

Iger was named president of Disney in 2000 and succeeded Michael Eisner as CEO in 2005, until his contract expired in 2020. He was then executive chairman until his formal retirement from the company on December 31, 2021. At the request of Disney's board of directors, Iger returned to Disney as CEO on November 20, 2022, following the dismissal of his appointed successor, Bob Chapek. In July 2023, Disney renewed Iger's contract until 2026. He was succeeded as CEO of Disney by Josh D'Amaro on March 18, 2026. He is an advisor to Thrive Capital.

Considered a highly effective and a visionary media executive, Iger was able to broaden Disney's roster of intellectual properties, expanded its presence in international markets, and oversaw an increase of the company's market capitalization from $56 billion to $231 billion during his initial 15-year stewardship of the company. He led the major acquisitions of Pixar in 2006 for $7.4 billion, Marvel Entertainment in 2009 for $4 billion, Lucasfilm in 2012 for $4.06 billion, and the entertainment assets of 21st Century Fox in 2019 for $71.3 billion.

Iger also expanded the company's theme park resorts presence in East Asia, with the introduction of Hong Kong Disneyland Resort and Shanghai Disney Resort in 2005 and 2016, respectively. He was a driving force behind the reinvigoration of Walt Disney Animation Studios, the branded-release strategy of its film studio's output, and the company's increased investment in its direct-to-consumer businesses, including Disney+ and Hulu.

In 2026, Iger bought the Los Angeles Lakers of the National Basketball Association (NBA) for a record $12 billion, alongside businessman Joshua Kushner.

== Early life and education ==
Robert Alan Iger was born on February 10, 1951, in New York City, to an Austrian-Jewish family. He is the oldest son of Miriam "Mimi" (née Tunick) (1927–2013) and Arthur L. Iger (1926–2010). His father was a World War II Navy veteran who was the executive vice president and general manager of the Greenvale Marketing Corporation, and was also a professor of advertising and public relations. His mother worked at Boardman Junior High School in Oceanside, New York. Iger's paternal grandfather, Joe, was cartoonist Jerry Iger's brother. He was raised in Oceanside, where he attended the Fulton Avenue School and graduated from Oceanside High School in 1969. In 1973, he graduated magna cum laude from the School of Communications at Ithaca College with a Bachelor of Science degree in Television and Radio.

== Career ==
Iger began his media career in 1972 as the host of Campus Probe, an Ithaca College television show. He dreamed of becoming a news anchor while he worked as a weatherman in Ithaca for five months, before shifting his career goals.

=== American Broadcasting Company (ABC) ===
In 1974, Iger joined the American Broadcasting Company (ABC). His first job was performing menial labor on television sets for $150 a week (over $700, adjusted for inflation). In 1988, Iger was the senior program executive for the Calgary Winter Olympics. The event was marred by disruptive weather and delayed events, and to fill the broadcast schedule Iger's team focused on human interest stories such as those of the Jamaican bobsled team and Eddie the Eagle. The event achieved record-high ratings for ABC, and Iger's performance under pressure caught the attention of ABC executives Daniel Burke and Thomas Murphy, who subsequently championed Iger throughout his ascent at ABC.

In 1989, Iger was named head of ABC Entertainment and green lighting several shows, such as Twin Peaks, America's Funniest Home Videos, and Cop Rock. He was president of the ABC Network Television Group from January 1993 to 1994, and was appointed as Capital Cities/ABC senior vice president in March 1993 and executive vice president in July 1993. In 1994, Iger was named president and chief operating officer of ABC's corporate parent, Capital Cities/ABC.

=== The Walt Disney Company ===
In 1995, the Walt Disney Company purchased Capital Cities/ABC and renamed it ABC, Inc., where Iger remained chairman until 1999. On February 25, 1999, he was appointed president of Walt Disney International, the business unit that oversees Disney's international operations, as well as chairman of the ABC Group, removing him from day-to-day authority at ABC. Disney called the change a promotion for Iger. Disney named Iger the president and chief operating officer (COO) on January 24, 2000, making him Disney's No. 2 executive under chairman and CEO, Michael Eisner. Disney had been without a separate president since Eisner assumed the role following the departure of Michael Ovitz in 1997, after sixteen months at Disney. In 2003, board members Roy E. Disney and Stanley Gold began a campaign called "save Disney" against Eisner. As a result, Disney began a search for the next CEO to replace Eisner. On March 13, 2005, Disney announced that Iger would succeed Michael Eisner as CEO, and Iger was placed in charge of day-to-day operations, though Eisner held the title of CEO until he resigned on September 30, 2005. In July 2005, Disney and Gold dropped the campaign and agreed to work with Iger.

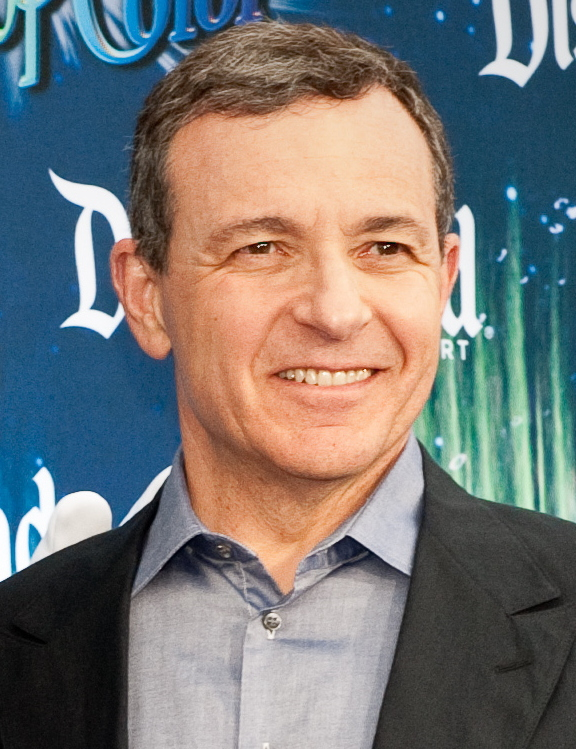
Iger in 2010

One of Iger's first major decisions as CEO was to reassign Disney's chief strategic officer, Peter Murphy, and disband the company's Strategic Planning division. It was around this time Iger started to become known as "Bob" rather than "Robert". On January 24, 2006, under Iger's leadership, Disney announced it would acquire Pixar for $7.4 billion in an all-stock transaction. In the same year, Iger also re-acquired the rights to Walt Disney's first star, Oswald the Lucky Rabbit, from NBCUniversal by releasing sportscaster Al Michaels from ABC Sports to NBC Sports. In August 2009, Iger negotiated for Disney to acquire Marvel Entertainment and its associated assets for $4 billion. By 2014, Disney had grossed more than that amount at the box office through the Marvel movies. On October 7, 2011, Disney announced that Iger would become chairman of the board following John Pepper's retirement from the board in March 2012. In October 2012, Iger signed a deal with filmmaker George Lucas to purchase Lucasfilm for $4 billion. As a result, Disney acquired the rights to the Star Wars multimedia franchise and Indiana Jones. In March 2016, Iger announced the opening of the $5.5 billion Shanghai Disney Resort later that year.

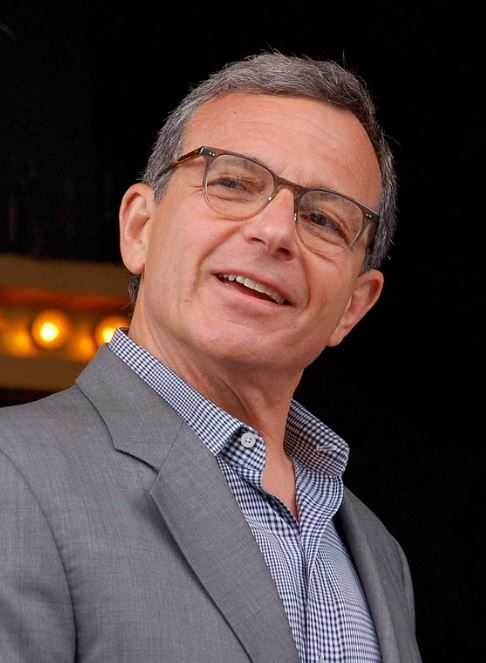
Iger in 2013

Iger's contract as Disney's chairman and CEO was originally planned to run until June 30, 2018. In March 2017, Disney extended Iger's term to July 2, 2019, and said he would be a consultant for the following three years. In December 2017, Disney extended Iger's contract through 2021. In July 2018, Disney and 21st Century Fox shareholders approved a deal to allow Disney to purchase Fox assets. The deal was finalized in March 2019. In April 2019, it was announced that Iger would depart from his position as CEO and chairman of Disney when his contract expired in 2021. Iger resigned from Apple's board of directors on September 10, 2019, to avoid a conflict of interest as Disney and Apple prepared to launch competing streaming services Disney+ and Apple TV+. In September 2019, Iger released his memoir The Ride of a Lifetime.

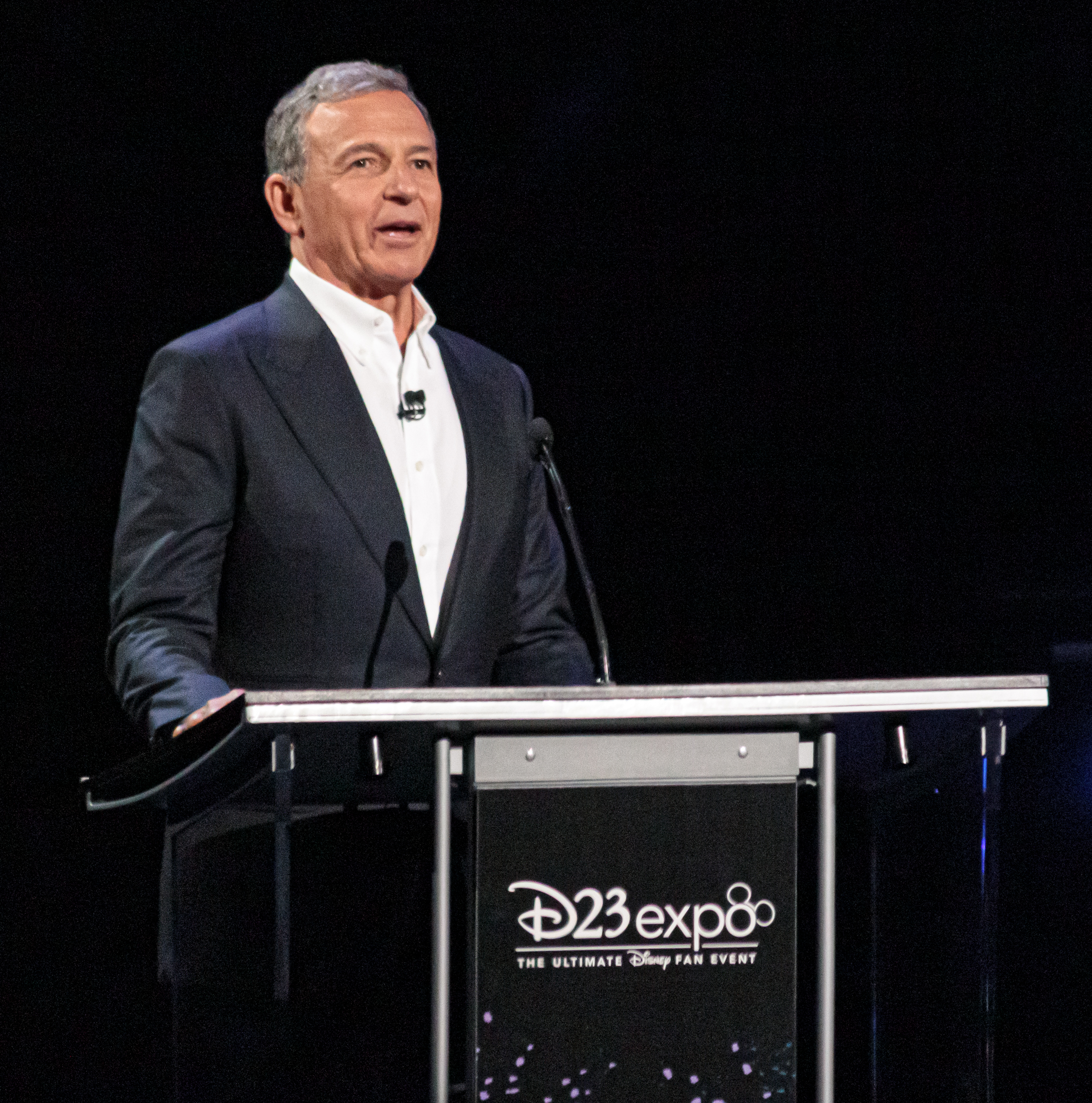
Iger at the D23 Expo in 2019

In 2020, Iger announced his intention to retire. On February 25, the board of directors named Bob Chapek – then-chairman of Disney Parks, Experiences and Products – the new chief executive, while appointing Iger executive chairman (an ad hoc post) to oversee the transition. In April, the board unexpectedly extended Iger's mandate until the end of 2021 due to the COVID-19 pandemic. On December 31, 2021, Iger stepped down and was succeeded by Susan Arnold as chair of the board. On November 20, 2022, Chapek was ousted by the Disney board with Iger reinstated as CEO. At the time of his rejoining Disney, Iger initially agreed to hold the post for two years while looking for a successor. On July 12, 2023, Iger and Disney extended the contract until the end of 2026. Iger's 2023 pay package included a base salary of $865,385, stock awards of $16.1 million, $10 million in stock option awards, $2.1 million in performance-based compensation, and $2.48 million in other compensation, leading to a total pay award of $31.6 million according to Disney's annual proxy statement. During Iger's second tenure, Disney's share price has remained substantially below record heights in 2021 under Chapek, despite streaming becoming profitable and strong theme park performance. Disney's share price has increased 22% under Iger's second tenure versus 68% for the S&P 500. In January 2026, Iger announced that he intended to leave CEO role before the contract ends. He would officially step down as CEO at the company's annual meeting on March 18, 2026, while still staying on as senior advisor and a board member until the end of the year.

Iger provided the voice of the weather forecaster Bob Tiger in Disney Animation's 2025 film Zootopia 2.

=== Company boards and other activities ===
On November 15, 2011, Apple Inc., led by CEO Tim Cook, named Iger to its board of directors. Iger was reportedly responsible for making Steve Jobs Disney's largest shareholder after its all-stock acquisition of Jobs's Pixar. In September 2019, Iger resigned from his position on the board after Apple announced the pricing and release date of Apple TV+, a subscription streaming service which would compete with Disney+ upon its launch in November 2021.

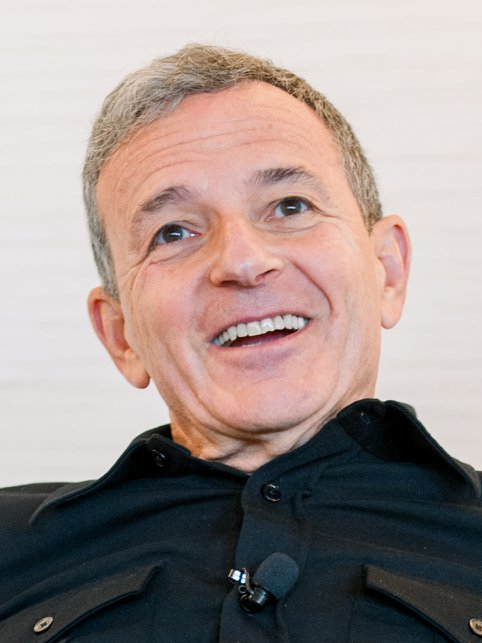
Iger in 2022

In October 2020, Iger became a director of the dairy-replacement startup Perfect Day. Iger joined the board of Genies, Inc. in March 2022. In July 2024, Iger and his wife, Willow Bay, agreed to take a majority stake in Angel City FC, a Los Angeles-based National Women's Soccer League team, with a $100 million investment. To avoid any conflicts of interest, Iger agreed to recuse himself from all Disney and ESPN business matters related to the women's soccer league.

=== Los Angeles Lakers ===
On August 12, 2026, ESPN reported that Iger, along with American businessman Josh Kushner, had agreed to purchase the Los Angeles Lakers for a record setting $12 billion.

== Personal life ==
Iger has been married twice. His first marriage to Kathleen Susan Iger ended in divorce. They had two daughters. In 1995, Iger married journalist Willow Bay in an interfaith Jewish and Roman Catholic service in Bridgehampton, New York, and they have two sons. According to Forbes, Iger's estimated net worth is over $700 million in 2024.

=== Politics ===
Iger has described himself as a centrist. He previously identified with the Democratic Party. In 2016, Iger switched his party registration from Democratic to independent. In May 2016, during a dispute over Disney Resort's low wages, Iger wrote in a Facebook post claiming that Disney had hired 11,000 new employees in the past decade at Disneyland, and 18,000 in the past five years in the US. Iger specifically targeted US Senator from Vermont Bernie Sanders, who had been outspoken on the issue. Disney settled with the US Department of Labor and agreed to pay back wages the following year.

Iger co-chaired a fundraiser for the Hillary Clinton 2016 presidential campaign on August 22, 2016. He was named to President-elect Donald Trump's Strategic and Policy Forum on December 2, 2016. He resigned from the Forum on June 1, 2017, out of protest after President Trump withdrew the United States from the Paris Climate Agreement. Iger had considered running for president before and after the 2016 U.S. presidential election as a Democrat, but ultimately decided against it.

== Accolades and recognition ==
In December 2019, Iger was named by Time as their Businessperson of the Year. In 2020, he was inducted into the Television Hall of Fame. In September 2022, Iger was appointed an Honorary Knight Commander of the Order of the British Empire (KBE) by Queen Elizabeth II "for services to the UK/US relations". In October 2024, Iger was awarded with the title of Chevalier de la Legion d'honneur by French president Emmanuel Macron for his service to the country of France. In 2026, Iger's successor as CEO of Disney, Josh D'Amaro, named Iger a Disney Legend.

== Controversies ==
In November 2017, Variety reported that Iger knew about a 2010 Oscar party where Pixar chief John Lasseter was seen "making out with a junior staffer", seeming to confirm anonymous allegations that Lasseter's inappropriate interactions with young women had been known to company leadership since the 1990s. One anonymous source was quoted as saying, "I know personally that Bob was aware. ... Everybody was aware. They just didn't do anything about it."

In August 2019, Vanity Fair reported that actress Paz de la Huerta added Iger to her lawsuit against Harvey Weinstein over allegations of rape, claiming that he and previous CEO Michael Eisner "made a series of decisions that allowed a range of actions by Harvey Weinstein that unacceptably harmed certain employees". Disney denied any knowledge of misconduct or settlements with victims during Weinstein's run at Miramax from 1993 to 2005.

During a July 2023 interview on CNBC, Iger criticized the WGA and SAG-AFTRA strikes as "not realistic". He added that the unions "are adding to the set of the challenges that this business is already facing that is, quite frankly, very disruptive." Iger's comments were widely criticized both inside and outside of Hollywood for being elitist and out of touch, with HuffPost writer Marina Fang noting Iger's $27 million annual salary that he received when rejoining Disney.

In December 2024, Iger approved a $16 million settlement with Donald Trump, who had just won the 2024 U.S. presidential election, over a lawsuit that Trump had filed against ABC News. Critics saw Iger's surrender to Trump as a dangerous precedent and threat to free speech in the United States.

On September 17 through September 22, 2025, Iger was concurrent head of Disney when Disney-owned ABC indefinitely suspended Jimmy Kimmel Live! following pressure by the second Trump administration and right-wing media to punish Jimmy Kimmel, for claiming the MAGA movement was trying to cover up that Tyler Robinson, the man who assassinated conservative activist Charlie Kirk, was a Republican. According to The Hollywood Reporter, Iger made the decision to suspend Kimmel jointly with Dana Walden. Michael Eisner, Iger's predecessor as CEO of Disney, condemned Iger publicly on Twitter, saying, "Where has all the leadership gone?" and "Maybe the Constitution should have said, 'Congress shall make no law abridging the freedom of speech, or of the press, except in one's political or financial self-interest'". Kimmel was later allowed to return to the air.

== Works ==
- Iger, Robert (September 23, 2019). The Ride of a Lifetime: Lessons Learned from 15 Years as CEO of the Walt Disney Company. Penguin Random House. ISBN 9780399592096. OCLC 1111242203.

Business positions
Preceded by Brandon Stoddard	President of ABC Entertainment; 1989–1992	Succeeded by Ted Harbert
Vacant Title last held by Michael Ovitz	President of the Walt Disney Company; 2000–2012	Vacant
Preceded by Michael Eisner	CEO of the Walt Disney Company; 2005–2020	Succeeded by Bob Chapek
Preceded by Bob Chapek	CEO of the Walt Disney Company; 2022–2026	Succeeded by Josh D'Amaro
Preceded by John E. Pepper Jr.	Chairman of the Walt Disney Company; 2012–2021	Succeeded by Susan Arnold
New title	Executive chairman of the Walt Disney Company; 2020–2021	Vacant
