= Larbi Batma =

Moroccan musician (1947–1997)

- Born: 1947; Chaouia
- Died: 1997 (aged 49–50)
- Citizenship: Morocco
- Occupations: Musician; poet; singer; writer; actor

Laarbi Batma (or Laarbi Batma) (Arabic: العربي باطما; born in Chaouia; 7 February 1947 - 7 February 1997) was a Moroccan musician, poet, singer, writer, actor, and the front man of the group Nass El Ghiwane.

== Early life ==
Laarbi grew up in the Hay Mohammadi neighborhood in Casablanca.

He was very much influenced by the music style of the mawsims of his native region that he used to frequent as a child.

== Nass El Ghiwane ==
Laarbi was a founding member of Nass El Ghiwane. He was a vocalist and percussionist for the group until his death in 1997.

== Cinema ==
Laarbi was the lead actor in the Moroccan movie Le jour du forain, directed by Driss Kettani and Abdelkrim Derkaoui. He also starred in Ahmed el-Maanouni's Trances, a documentary on Nass El Ghiwane.

== See also ==
- Nass El Ghiwane – Moroccan band
- Hay Mohammadi
