= 475 (film) =

- Film poster
- Directed by: Nadir Bouhmouch
- Written by: Nadir Bouhmouch, Houda Lamqaddam
- Produced by: Aziza Zriouel, Montasser Drissi
- Cinematography: Hamza Mahfoudi, Amina Benalioulhaj
- Edited by: Nadir Bouhmouch
- Release date: 18 February 2013
- Running time: 63 minutes
- Country: Morocco
- Language: Arabic

475 is a 2013 Moroccan documentary film by director Nadir Bouhmouch. The film explores sexual violence and women's rights in Morocco through the Amina Filali affair, a young girl who committed suicide after being forced to marry her rapist in 2012.

== Synopsis ==
In March 2012, Amina Filali, a 16-year-old Moroccan girl, committed suicide by swallowing rat poison in a small village outside of Larache. Her suicide came a year after she was forced to marry a man who had raped her. According to Article 475 of the Moroccan penal code, a rapist can escape prosecution and imprisonment if he marries his victim. Authorities in Morocco failed to properly investigate Filali's death, which dominated the Moroccan and international media. Through this horrifying affair, interviews with Filali's parents, her rapist's father, a lawyer and other members of Moroccan civil society, the film delves into the various facets of patriarchy in Morocco while questioning the way it was portrayed by the mainstream media.

== Production ==
Like Bouhmouch's first film My Makhzen and Me, 475 was produced clandestinely with no shooting permits in what director Nadir Bouhmouch calls "an act of civil disobedience" against Morocco's state film institution, the Centre Cinematographique Marocain (CCM); and what they perceive as restrictive film laws and censorship. The crew was reduced to a small team of volunteers who had little or no experience in filmmaking. Instead of asking for state funding from the CCM, the filmmakers resorted to a crowd-funding campaign.
