= Les griffes du passé =

- Directed by: Abdelkrim Derkaoui
- Written by: Toufiq Benjelloun
- Starring: Narjis Hallak, Ayoub Layousifi, Bouchra Khalid, Ahmed Saguia
- Cinematography: Ali Benjelloun
- Edited by: Ilias Lakhmass
- Music by: Louis Taha Mancaux
- Release date: 2014
- Country: Morocco
- Language: Moroccan Arabic
- Budget: 5.000.000 MAD

Les griffes du passé is a 2014 film directed by Abdelkrim Derkaoui. The film is inspired by two real events. The first is that of Amina Filali who committed suicide after being forced to marry her rapist. The second is that of a woman who was raped and then sentenced to seven years in prison after mutilating her rapist's genitals.

== Synopsis ==
The melodrama tells the story of Bouchra, a devoted nurse who saves the life of officer Karim, who is working with his brigade to dismantle a terrorist cell. He falls madly in love with her and ends up marrying her. At the same time, Commissioner Trabelsi, Karim's colleague, is investigating a series of bizarre, violent murders which turns out to be the consequence of a relentless revenge following justice not served.

== Cast ==
- Narjis Hallak
- Ayoub Layousifi
- Bouchra Khalid
- Ahmed Saguia
- Mouhcine Malzi
- Karim Doniazale
- Abdelghani Sennak
- Noureddine Bikr
- Abdellatif Chagra
- Amine Benjelloun
- Majid Lakroun
- Anis Elkouhen
- Toufik Benjelloun
- Rabea Rafii
