= Genies, Inc. =

American avatar technology company

Genies
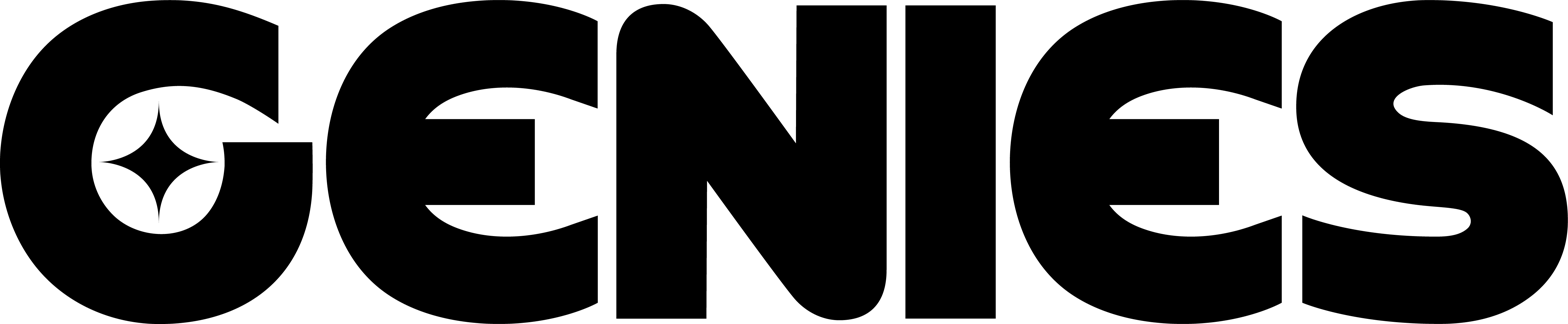
- Type: Private
- Founded: 2017; 9 years ago
- Founder: Akash Nigam
- Headquarters: Los Angeles, California, U.S.
- Number of employees: 90 (2021)
- Website: genies.com

Genies is an American AI avatar and companion company founded by Akash Nigam. Genies' consumer apps and tools allow users to create fully personalized AI avatars to be used in apps and games. Genies offers a software development kit (SDK) enabling developers, brands and talent to create a branded avatar experience and online marketplaces.

Early in 2026, the company announced its first two public IP partners. The MLB's PA, MLB Players Inc. to turn all players into AI Characters and King Records. In 2025, Genies partnered with Unity to bring AI avatars and UGC tools to developers.

Soon after this, the company announced collaborations with the NBPA, WEBTOON and Sanrio. All are focused on Genies mission of providing a visual layer for AI adoption.

Genies consumer products are headlined by Chat, a consumer product where anyone can talk with interactive 3D AI characters spanning categories like Stories & Fantasy, Celebs & Experts, and Life & Relationships. Each character features a unique personality, backstory, and 3D avatar.

== History ==
Nigam founded a company called Blend, which made a mobile app for college students that gifted items in exchange for sharing photos. The company received an acquisition offer but declined. Shortly after, the pair began using much of Blend's proprietary technology to build Genies. The company also with talent agencies to create digital versions of its clients.

In March 2022, then-former Disney CEO Bob Iger joined the board of the company.

In 2023, Genies created a software development kit aimed at developers, IP and gamers.

Genies have been adopted by celebrities such as Justin Bieber, Russell Westbrook, and Shawn Mendes.

In 2024, Genies unveiled its Avatar Framework, which supports customizable avatars, fashion, and props. In 2025, Genies partnered with Unity to bring AI avatars and UGC tools to developers. Later that year Genies Launches Avatar Creation Tools for Celebrities and Talent Agencies

== Funding ==
The company has raised $250 million in funding from Silicon Valley venture capitalists such as Silver Lake Breyer Capital, Bond Capital, and Bob Iger. Genies has also received funding from other sources, such as entrepreneurs, talent agencies, and Fortune 500 companies. Genies currently employs over 100 people and the company is valued at over $1 billion. In November 2020, Japanese multinational video game developer and publisher Bandai Namco Entertainment announced a $3 million investment in Genies including an expansion in Asia.
