= The Ride of a Lifetime =

2019 memoir by Bob Iger

- First edition
- Author: Bob Iger
- Language: English
- Genre: Memoir
- Published: September 23, 2019
- Publisher: Random House
- Publication place: United States of America
- ISBN: 978-0399592096

The Ride of a Lifetime is a 2019 memoir written by media executive and businessman Bob Iger describing his elevation to fame and corporate achievements in his life.
