= Le jour du forain =

- Directed by: Abdelkarim Derkaoui, Driss Kettani
- Written by: Driss Kettani, Mostafa Derkaoui
- Starring: Touria Jabrane, Larbi Batma, Hamid Zoughi
- Cinematography: Abdelkarim Derkaoui
- Edited by: Hamid Benchrif, Mohamed Meziane
- Music by: Larbi Batma
- Release date: 1984
- Country: Morocco
- Language: Moroccan Arabic

Le jour du forain (English: The Travelling Showman's Day, Arabic: الناعورة) is a 1984 Moroccan film co-directed by Abdelkarim Derkaoui and Driss Kettani.

== Synopsis ==
Moulay Yacoub is a fairground artist who earns his living from fair to fair, from village to village. The film follows his itinerary across the country as well as his spiritual journey.

== Cast ==
- Touria Jabrane
- Larbi Batma
- Hamid Zoughi
- Mostapha Salamat
- Salaheddine Benmoussa
