= Izza Génini =

Moroccan movie producer and director (born 1942)

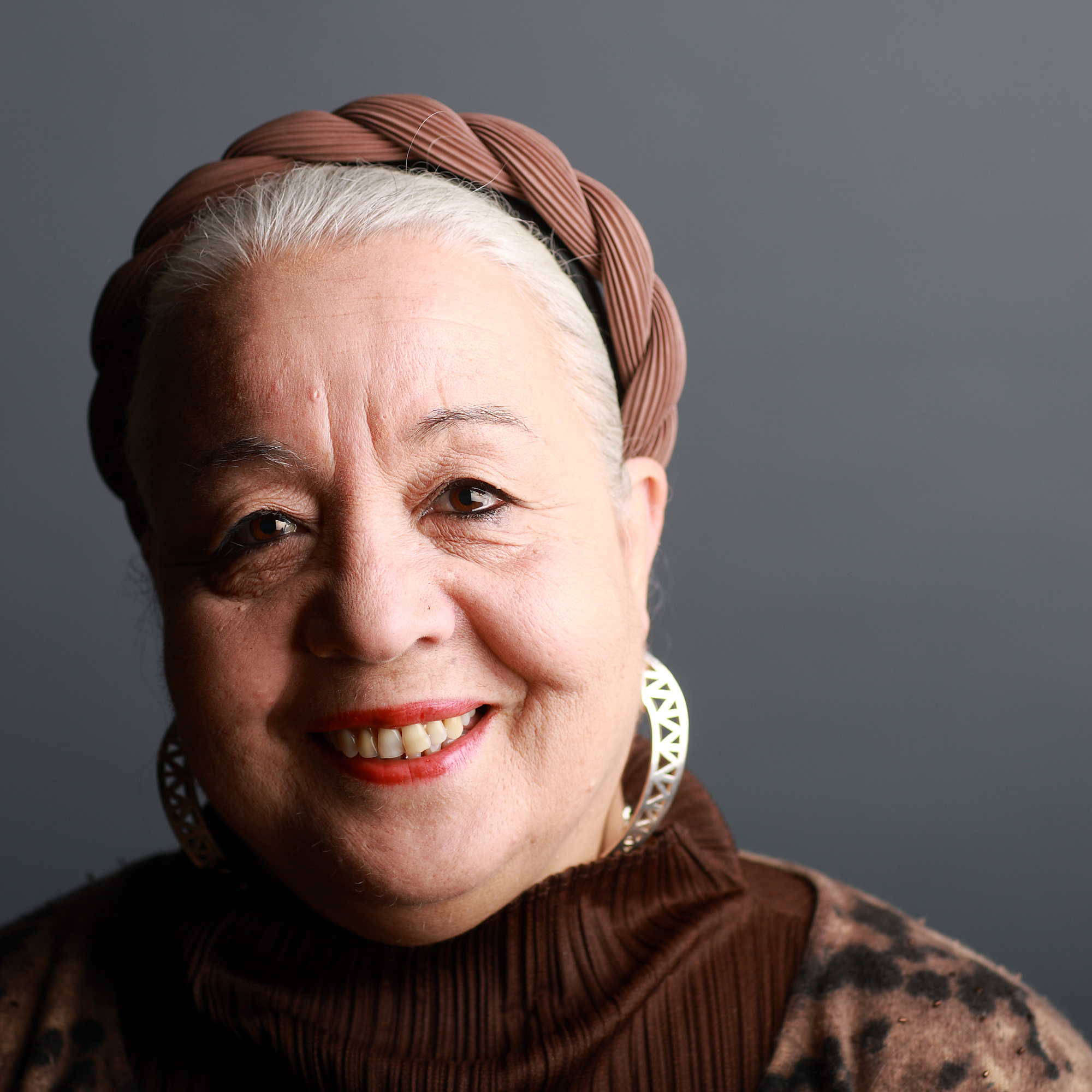
- Izza Génini in 2008
- Born: 1942 (age 83–84); Casablanca
- Occupations: Movie producer, director
- Website: www.marocorama.com

Izza Génini (born 1942) is a Moroccan movie producer and director. She has lived and worked in Paris, France since 1960.

== Biography ==
Izza Génini was born in Casablanca, Morocco, in 1942 to a Jewish family.

After studying literature and foreign languages at the Sorbonne and the Institut national des langues et civilisations orientales, both in Paris, Génini decided to enter cinema. In 1973, she founded SOGEAV for the distribution of French films in French speaking African nations, distribution of African films abroad, and the production of films El Hal and Transes, the latter of the two directed by Ahmed El Maanouni. Martin Scorsese would later remaster this film in his World Cinema Project, with an interview with Génini included on the disk. In 1987, Génini began the production of a documentary series on traditional Moroccan music called Maroc, corps et âme, or Morocco, Body and Soul, containing fifteen parts.

From 1970 to 1986, she was the Director of Club 70 productions.

Génini was a member of the tribute organization dedicated to the memory of Simon Lévy, who made it his mission to preserve Judeo-Moroccan heritage.
