= Leila Hadioui =

Moroccan actress and model

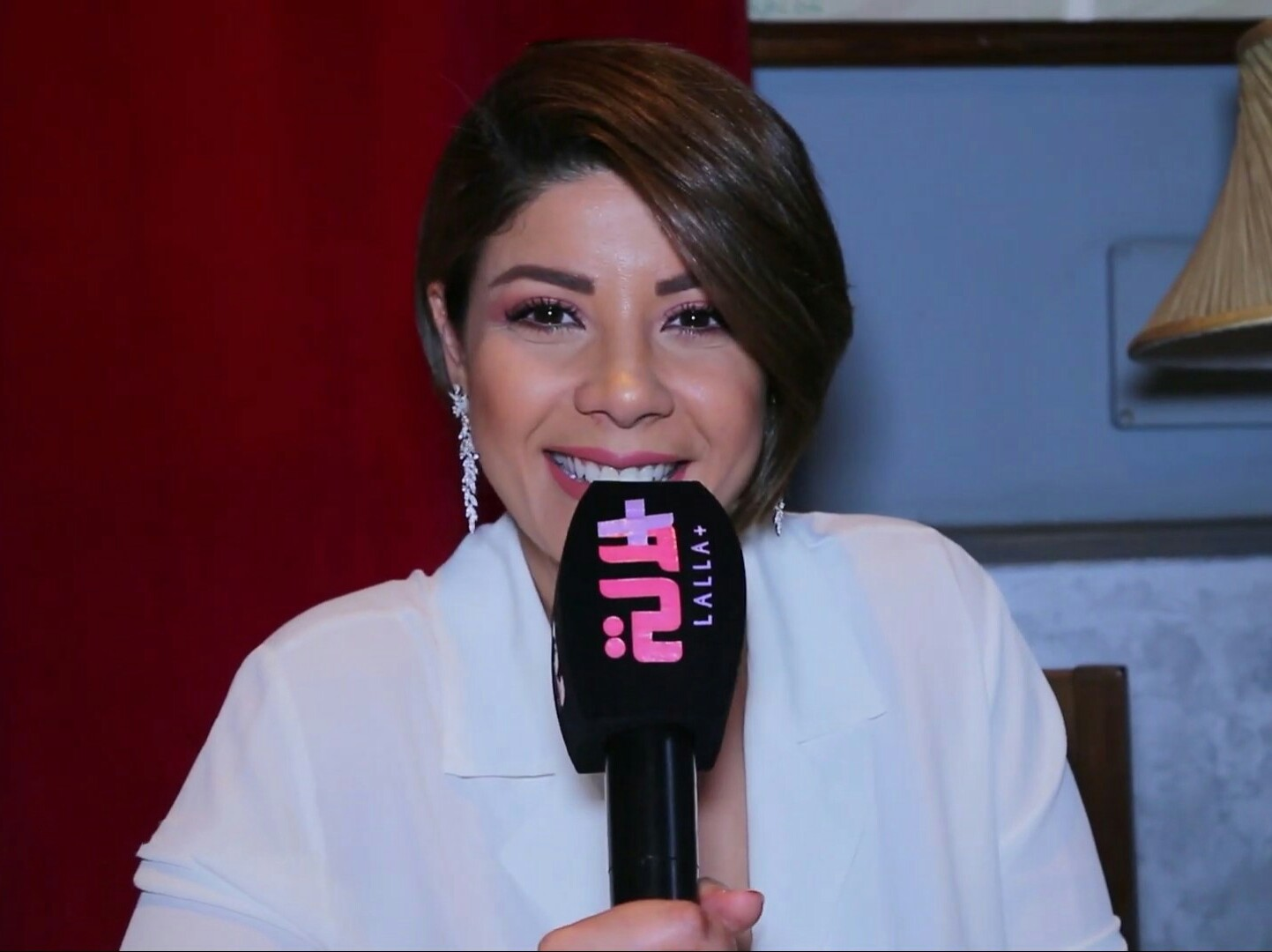
- Born: January 16, 1985 (age 41); Casablanca, Morocco
- Occupations: Actress, model, television presenter
- Years active: 2007-present
- Children: 1
- Father: Noureddine Hadioui

Leila Hadioui (born 16 January 1985) is a Moroccan actress, model, and television presenter.

== Biography ==
Hadioui was born in Casablanca in 1985. Her father Noureddine Hadioui was the muezzin of the Hassan II Mosque in Casablanca. She was interested in fashion from a young age, frequently watching fashion programming on television. At the age of 17, she made her debut as a model. Hadioui collaborated with the top Moroccan designers in the Caftan 2007 show. In 2007, she walked in Paris, and later founded her own women's clothing line. Hadioui is the face of Diamantine and GC.

In 2010, Hadioui appeared in the TV film Les Enfants Terribles de Casablanca, directed by Abdelkarim Derkaoui. She has served as a presenter of the fashion program Sabahiyate. In 2014, she starred in the film Sara directed by Said Naciri. She has appeared in films, soap opers, and television shows. Hadioui has stated that she does not want to perform in any films outside Morocco because she gets homesick, and the longest vacation outside the country that she took was two weeks.

Hadioui is married, and is the mother of Ines, born in 2005. Her father was killed in the 2015 Mina disaster. In the aftermath, many fake Facebook profiles were made for her, which she denounced. In March 2020, she uploaded a video of her daughter and her dancing in response to the COVID-19 pandemic, which led to a great amount of outcry.

== Filmography ==
- 2009 : 37 Kilometers Celsius
- 2010 : Les Enfants Terribles de Casablanca
- 2011-2018 : Sabahiyat (TV series)
- 2011 : Une Heure En Enfer (TV series)
- 2014 : Sara
- 2017 : The Pilgrims
- 2017 : l’khawa (TV series)
- 2018 : Hay L'Behja
