= Mustapha Zaari =

Moroccan stage and film actor (1938–2024)

- مصطفى الزعري
- Born: 25 July 1938; Casablanca, Morocco
- Died: 3 December 2024 (aged 86); Casablanca, Morocco
- Occupation: Actor

Mustapha Zaari (Arabic: مصطفى الزعري; 25 July 1938 – 3 December 2024) was a Moroccan actor and comedian. His career lasted over 50 years.

== Life and career ==
Zaari was raised by his mother, after his father died when he was three years old. His mother sent him to a theater club.

His career started in the 1960s. During the early part of his career he worked in theater together with many prominent people. His first movie appearance was in Silence, sens interdit (1973) by Abdellah Mesbahi. He also played in the movie The Hyena's Sun (1976) and Chroniques blanches (2009). He is known for his comedic roles together with Mustapha Dassoukine. Zaari was honored at multiple national festivals throughout his career.

== Death ==
Zaari died of heart failure just after being declared cured of his lung cancer, which had lasted for nine months in Casablanca, on 3 December 2024, at the age of 85.
