= Burned Hearts =

- French: Les Coeurs brûlés
- Directed by: Ahmed El Maanouni
- Screenplay by: Ahmed El Maanouni
- Produced by: Rabii Films Productions
- Starring: Hicham Bahloul; Mohamed Derhem; Mohammed Marouazi; Az Al Arab Kaghat; Amal Setta; Nadia Alami; Khouloud; Fatimzahra Lahlou
- Cinematography: Pierre Boffety
- Edited by: Oussama Oussidhoum
- Music by: Mohamed Derhem, Abdelaziz Tahiri
- Release date: 2007
- Running time: 84 minutes
- Country: Morocco

Burned Hearts (French: Les Coeurs brûlés) is a 2007 Moroccan film directed by Ahmed El Maanouni.

== Synopsis ==
Amin, a young architect who lives in Paris, returns suddenly to his hometown, Fès, Morocco, where his uncle is dying. He has not spoken to the man who brought him up since he left his hometown ten years earlier to study and settle in Paris. The visits of the young architect to the hospital revive the deep wounds of his painful childhood. His long-time friend, the craftsman Aziz, exhorts him not to surrender to past resentments. His uncle's death does not soothe the young man's pains, forcing him to look for answers within his soul.

== Awards ==
- Tanger 2007
- Dubai 2007
