= Peter Murphy (hurler) =

Irish hurler

Personal information
- Native name: Peadar Ó Murchú (Irish)
- Born: 7 November 1961 (age 64) Loughrea, County Galway

Sport
- Sport: Hurling
- Position: Goalkeeper
Club
- Years: Club
- 1970s-1990s: Loughrea
Club titles
- Galway titles: 0
Inter-county
- Years: County
- 1980s: Galway
Inter-county titles
- All-Irelands: 2
- NHL: 2
- All Stars: 0

Peter Murphy (born 7 November 1961 in Loughrea, County Galway) is an Irish former sportsperson. He played hurling with his local club Loughrea and was a member of the Galway senior inter-county team in the 1980s.
