= Peter Murphy (JAG) =

Peter M. Murphy
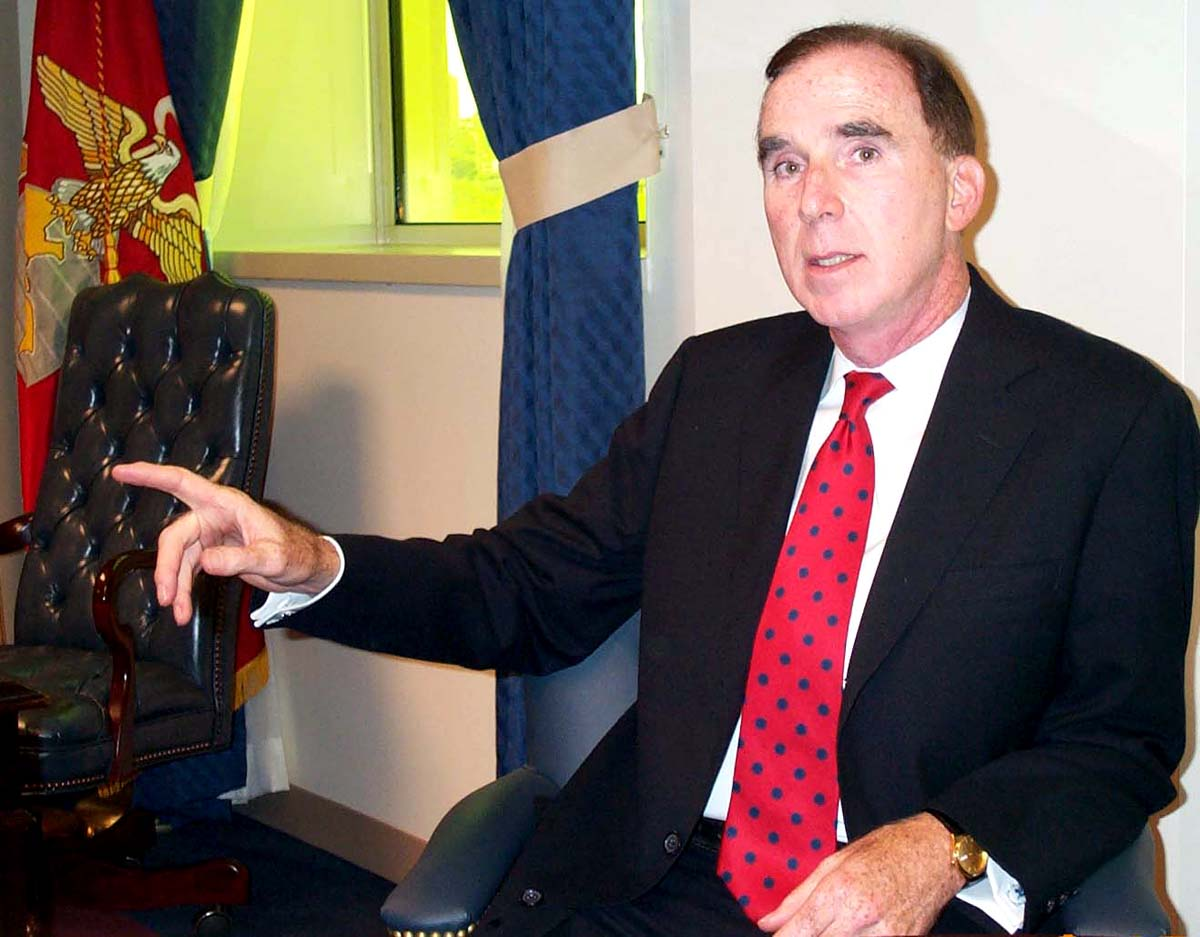
- Murphy in the Pentagon
- Military career
- Branch: United States Army
- Unit: Infantry
- Other work: Attorney

Peter M. Murphy is an American lawyer, and former senior legal advisor to the Commandant of the Marine Corps. Murphy was the Commandant's legal advisor twenty years prior to becoming a partner with the legal firm of Holland & Knight. At Holland & Knight Murphy specialized in Government litigation.

Murphy earned his B.A. in 1972, at Long Island University. He earned his J.D. in 1974 at Saint John’s University School of Law.

United States Secretary of Defense asked Murphy to serve on a panel to look into the Haditha incident in 2006.

Murphy was senior legal advisor to the United States Marine Corps Commandant in 1989, when he drafted "The Importance of Environmental Law Considerations for the Military Commander & Advisor".

In The Pentagon at the time it was hit in the September 11, attacks, Murphy later gave interviews to press and government agencies describing how he was one of the few people to instantly assume the explosion was a plane hitting the building. The Marine Corps flag from behind his desk was taken and memorialised, being flown in Afghanistan, before being sent into outer space. Seapower reports that Murphy was injured on 9-11.

He is notable for his participation in discussions, in December 2002, of reports that interrogators from the Joint Task Force 160 and Joint Task Force 170 were using controversial interrogation techniques on the captives held in the Guantanamo Bay detention camps, in Cuba.

Murphy was the Counsel to the Commandant of the United States Marine Corps's when Alberto J. Mora, the Department of the Navy's General Counsel convened several meetings of the Navy's most senior lawyers after David Brant, the Director of the NCIS, drew Mora's attention to use of the questionable interrogation techniques by the Navy's tenants at Guantanamo.
