= The Last Temptation of Christ (film) =

1988 film directed by Martin Scorsese

- Theatrical release poster
- Directed by: Martin Scorsese
- Screenplay by: Paul Schrader
- Based on: The Last Temptation of Christ by Nikos Kazantzakis
- Produced by: Barbara De Fina
- Starring: Willem Dafoe; Harvey Keitel; Barbara Hershey; Harry Dean Stanton; David Bowie
- Cinematography: Michael Ballhaus
- Edited by: Thelma Schoonmaker
- Music by: Peter Gabriel
- Production companies: Universal Pictures; Cineplex Odeon Films; Testament Productions
- Distributed by: Universal Pictures (Worldwide); Cineplex Odeon Films (Canada)
- Release date: August 12, 1988 (United States)
- Running time: 163 minutes
- Countries: Canada; United States
- Language: English
- Budget: $7 million
- Box office: $33.8 million

The Last Temptation of Christ is a 1988 epic religious drama film directed by Martin Scorsese. Written by Paul Schrader, with uncredited rewrites from Scorsese and Jay Cocks, it is an adaptation of Nikos Kazantzakis' controversial 1955 novel of the same name. The film, starring Willem Dafoe, Harvey Keitel, Barbara Hershey, Andre Gregory, Harry Dean Stanton and David Bowie, was shot entirely in Morocco.

The film depicts the life of Jesus Christ and his struggle with various forms of temptation including fear, doubt, depression, reluctance and lust. The book and the film depict Christ being tempted by imagining himself engaged in sexual activities, which caused outrage from certain Christian groups, claiming the work as blasphemy. It includes a disclaimer stating: "This film is not based on the Gospels, but upon the fictional exploration of the eternal spiritual conflict."

The Last Temptation of Christ was released by Cineplex Odeon Films in Canada and by Universal Pictures worldwide on August 12, 1988. Like the novel, the film was controversial among many conservative and Christian groups and faced calls for its boycott and censorship. The film garnered modest critical and commercial success, grossing $33.8 million against a $7 million budget and receiving numerous accolades including a nomination for the Academy Award for Best Director to Scorsese.

== Plot ==
Jesus of Nazareth is a carpenter in the Roman client state Judea. He is torn between his own desires and his knowledge of God's plan for him. His friend Judas Iscariot is sent to kill him for collaborating with the Romans to crucify Jewish rebels, but suspects that Jesus is the Messiah and asks him to lead a war of liberation against the Romans. While Jesus assures him that his message is one of love for mankind, Judas warns him not to harm the rebellion.

Jesus starts preaching after saving prostitute Mary Magdalene from a stoning. He acquires disciples, some whom want freedom from the Romans while Jesus maintains people should tend to matters of the spirit. After being baptized by John the Baptist, Jesus goes into the desert to test his connection to God, where he resists temptation by Satan. Returning from the desert, Jesus is nursed back to health by Martha and Mary of Bethany, who encourage him to marry and have children.

After performing miracles, including raising Lazarus from the dead, Jesus' ministry reaches Jerusalem, where he and his followers chase out money changers from the temple. He begins bleeding from his hands, which he recognizes as a sign that he must die on the cross to bring salvation to mankind and instructs Judas to give him to the Romans. Jesus convenes his disciples for a Passover seder, whereupon Judas leads a contingent of soldiers to arrest Jesus in the garden of Gethsemane. Although acknowledging his virtues and their significance, Pontius Pilate tells Jesus that he must be put to death as he represents a threat to the Roman Empire; he is subsequently beaten, flogged, mocked and taken to be crucified.

While on the cross, a young girl who claims to be Jesus' guardian angel tells him that, while he is the Son of God, he is not the Messiah and that God is pleased with him and wants him to be happy. She brings him down off the cross and takes him to Mary Magdalene, whom he marries. They live a happy life, but when she abruptly dies, Jesus is consoled by his angel and goes on to start a family with Mary and Martha, the sisters of Lazarus. As an older man, Jesus encounters the apostle Paul preaching about the Messiah and tries to tell him that he is the man about whom Paul has been preaching. Paul repudiates him, saying that even if Jesus had not died on the cross, his message was the truth, and nothing would stop him from proclaiming that. Jesus debates him, stating that salvation cannot be founded on lies.

Near the end of his life, with Jerusalem in the throes of rebellion, an elderly dying Jesus calls his former disciples to his bed. When Judas comes, he reveals Jesus' guardian angel is actually Satan, who tricked him into believing he did not have to give himself up to save the world. Crawling back through the burning city, Jesus reaches the site of his crucifixion and begs God to let him fulfill his purpose, stating "I want to be the Messiah!" Jesus then finds himself once more on the cross, having overcome the "last temptation" of escaping death, being married and raising a family, and the ensuing disaster that would have consequently encompassed mankind. Jesus cries out "It is accomplished!" and dies.

== Cast ==
- Willem Dafoe as Jesus
- Harvey Keitel as Judas Iscariot
- Barbara Hershey as Mary Magdalene
- Harry Dean Stanton as Saul/Paul of Tarsus
- David Bowie as Pontius Pilate
- Steve Shill as Centurion
- Verna Bloom as Mary, mother of Jesus
- Roberts Blossom as Aged Master
- Barry Miller as Jeroboam
- Gary Basaraba as Andrew
- Irvin Kershner as Zebedee
- Victor Argo as Peter
- Paul Herman as Philip
- John Lurie as James
- Michael Been as John
- Leo Burmester as Nathaniel
- Andre Gregory as John the Baptist
- Tomas Arana as Lazarus
- Alan Rosenberg as Thomas
- Nehemiah Persoff as Rabbi
- Peter Berling as Beggar
- Leo Marks as Satan
- Martin Scorsese as Isaiah
- Juliette Caton as Girl Angel
- Peggy Gormley as Martha
- Randy Danson as Mary
- Paul Greco as Zealot

== Production ==
=== Development ===
Martin Scorsese had wanted to make a film version of Jesus' life and was fascinated by the imagery of Jesus since childhood. He was given a copy of Nikos Kazantzakis's The Last Temptation of Christ in 1962 while attending New York University, but did not read it until 1972. During the filming of Boxcar Bertha he was given additional copies by Barbara Hershey and David Carradine. From 1975 to 1978, he slowly read the book and decided that he should adapt it. Paul Schrader wrote a screenplay based on the novel from 1981 to 1982. Scorsese and Jay Cocks edited Schrader's script over the course of eight months in 1983 and rewrote most of the dialogue. Cocks was initially credited as a writer alongside Schrader on the poster, but was removed after Schrader appealed to the Writers Guild of America.

Production started at Paramount Pictures in 1983 with a budget of $15–20 million. Aidan Quinn as Jesus and Sting as Pontius Pilate were members of the original cast. Jason Miller was considered for John the Baptist, but he dropped out of the production. Management at Paramount and its then parent company, Gulf+Western, grew uneasy due to the ballooning budget for the picture and protest letters received from religious groups. The project went into turnaround, and was finally canceled in December 1983. Scorsese went on to make After Hours instead, disappointed at Paramount's abandonment of the project.

Scorsese and his agent Harry J. Ufland attempted to revive the film and considered filming in Yugoslavia, Spain or North Africa. In 1986, Universal Studios became interested in the project. Scorsese offered to shoot the film in 58 days for $7 million, and Universal eventually greenlighted the production, as Scorsese agreed to direct a more mainstream film for the studio in the future (which eventually resulted in Cape Fear).

Scorsese struggled to find an actor that could play Jesus. He first noticed Willem Dafoe in To Live and Die in L.A. and Dafoe's performance in Platoon confirmed his beliefs about Dafoe's acting ability. Dafoe, who was teaching in Massachusetts at the time, immediately accepted the role. Sting was replaced by David Bowie.

On an episode of The Joe Rogan Experience in January 2025, Mel Gibson revealed that Scorsese asked him to play the role of Jesus in the film. Gibson said he told Scorsese at the time, "Wow. I'm not doing that." In his memoir, Eric Roberts discussed being offered the part of Jesus, but turned it down after receiving advice from his manager. Roberts alleges Scorsese was upset by his decision and holds a grudge against him as a result.

=== Filming ===
John Beard was hired as production designer at the suggestion of Terry Gilliam. Scorsese stated that he did not want the film to be lavish and was avoiding "pomp, solemnity, or excessive reverence". Jean-Pierre Delifer created the costumes for the film. On the first day of filming Scorsese was critical of the cleanliness of the Roman soldiers and had the extras roll around in the dirt.

Shooting was done in Morocco and the village of Oumnast served as Nazareth and Magdala. The desert scenes were shot twenty minutes outside of Oumnast. Meknes was used for the scenes in Jerusalem and the stables of Ismail Ibn Sharif were similar to the Al-Aqsa Mosque, which Scorsese had hoped to use for the 1983 shoot. Two days of filming was done in the mountains near Azrou and Itto. There were few special effects in the film and Scorsese relied on lighting and editing instead. The pagan temple featured in the scene depicting the Sermon on the Mount was based on Babylonian designs.

The crucifixion was shot over three days using sixty different camera setups. Filming was difficult as Dafoe could only stay on the cross for two to three minutes. The slow-motion shot of the jeering crowd at the crucifixion was inspired by a painting of the crucifixion done by Hieronymus Bosch.

Principal photography began in October 1987, and wrapped by December 25, 1987.

Barbara Hershey rejected use of body double in her sex scenes, saying, “I knew if I did the scene, I’d really feel like a whore.”

== Themes ==
Scorsese said Judas Iscariot (Harvey Keitel) "represents violence, the strong arm, but that's not the right way." and that the film was a conflict between the principles of brute force and love.

Scorsese added that he found "some passages of the book to be a bit hard on women". He noted that the Apostles were the first to abandon Jesus while women remained with him. The angel (Juliette Caton)'s line "There's only one woman in the world. One woman with many faces." was meant to alert the audience that the angel was a trick by Satan (Leo Marks).

== Music ==
The film's musical soundtrack, composed by Peter Gabriel, received a nomination for the Golden Globe Award for Best Original Score in 1988 and was released on CD with the title Passion, which won a Grammy Award for Best New Age Album in 1990. The film's score itself helped popularize world music. Gabriel subsequently compiled an album called Passion – Sources, including additional material by various musicians that inspired him in composing the soundtrack, or which he sampled for the soundtrack. The original scores brought together many international artists including Pakistani musician and vocalist Nusrat Fateh Ali Khan, Egyptian kanun player Abdul Aziz, Turkish ney flute player Kudsi Ergüner and Armenian duduk players Antranik Askarian and Vatche Housepian.

== Release ==
The film opened on August 12, 1988. The film was later screened as a part of the 45th Venice International Film Festival on September 7, 1988, and was also screened at the 36th San Sebastián International Film Festival on September 16. In response to the film's acceptance as a part of the festival's lineup, director Franco Zeffirelli removed his film Young Toscanini from the program.

Although The Last Temptation of Christ was released on VHS and Laserdisc, many video rental stores, including the then-dominant Blockbuster Video, declined to carry it for rental, as a result of the film's controversial reception. In 1997, the Criterion Collection issued a special edition of The Last Temptation of Christ on Laserdisc, which Criterion re-issued on DVD in 2000 and on Blu-ray disc in Region A in March 2012 and Region B in April 2019.

== Reception ==
=== Box office ===
The Last Temptation of Christ opened in 123 theaters on August 12, 1988, in the United States and Canada, and grossed $401,211 in its opening weekend. At the end of its run, it had grossed $8,373,585 in the United States and Canada. Internationally, it grossed $25.4 million for a worldwide total of $33.8 million.

=== Critical response ===
The review aggregator website Rotten Tomatoes reports that 82% of 103 film critics have given the film a positive review, with an average rating of 7.6/10. The consensus states: "Contrary to accusations of irreverence, The Last Temptation of Christ's biggest sins are actually languid pacing and some tinny dialogue — but Martin Scorsese's passion for the subject shines through in an oft-transcendent rumination on faith." Metacritic, which assigns a weighted average score out of 100 to reviews from mainstream critics, gives the film a score of 80 based on 18 reviews, indicating "generally favorable reviews".

In a four-out-of-four star review for the Chicago Sun-Times, Roger Ebert, who later included the film in his list of The Great Movies, wrote that Scorsese and screenwriter Paul Schrader "paid Christ the compliment of taking him and his message seriously, and they have made a film that does not turn him into a garish, emasculated image from a religious postcard. Here he is flesh and blood, struggling, questioning, asking himself and his father which is the right way, and finally, after great suffering, earning the right to say, on the cross, 'It is accomplished.'" Gene Siskel from the Chicago Tribune said: "Dafoe manages to draw us into the mystery, anguish and joy of the holy life. This is anything but another one of those boring biblical costume epics. There is genuine challenge and hope in this movie."

A review associated with Catholic News Service asserts that The Last Temptation of Christ "fails because of artistic inadequacy rather than anti-religious bias." Halliwell's Film Guide awarded it one star from a possible four, describing it as "beautifully shot and strikingly acted, but wordy and too long". Alan Jones awarded it four stars out of five for Radio Times, calling it "a challenging essay on the life of Jesus" and "neither blasphemous nor offensive", though he felt it was "slightly too long, and Scorsese does pull some punches in deference to the subject matter", but described these as "minor criticisms" and concluded that it was a "sincere work".

Scorsese was attached to direct a film adaptation of Schindler's Ark and worked with Steven Zaillian on the script, but withdrew from the project due to the reception of The Last Temptation of Christ. He also felt that it was inappropriate for a non-Jewish person to direct it.

== Controversy ==
=== Terrorist attack ===
On October 22, 1988, an Integralist Catholic group set fire to the Saint Michel cinema in Paris while it was showing the film. Shortly after midnight, an incendiary device ignited under a seat in the less supervised underground room, where a different film was being shown. The incendiary device consisted of a charge of potassium chlorate, triggered by a vial containing sulfuric acid. The attack injured thirteen people, four of whom were severely burned, and severely damaged the cinema.

=== Death threats ===
In Roger Ebert's book Scorsese by Ebert, the critic wrote of the reaction to The Last Temptation of Christ, "...Scorsese was targeted by death threats and the jeremiads of TV evangelists". The threats were significant enough that Scorsese had to use bodyguards during public appearances for a few years.

=== Protests ===
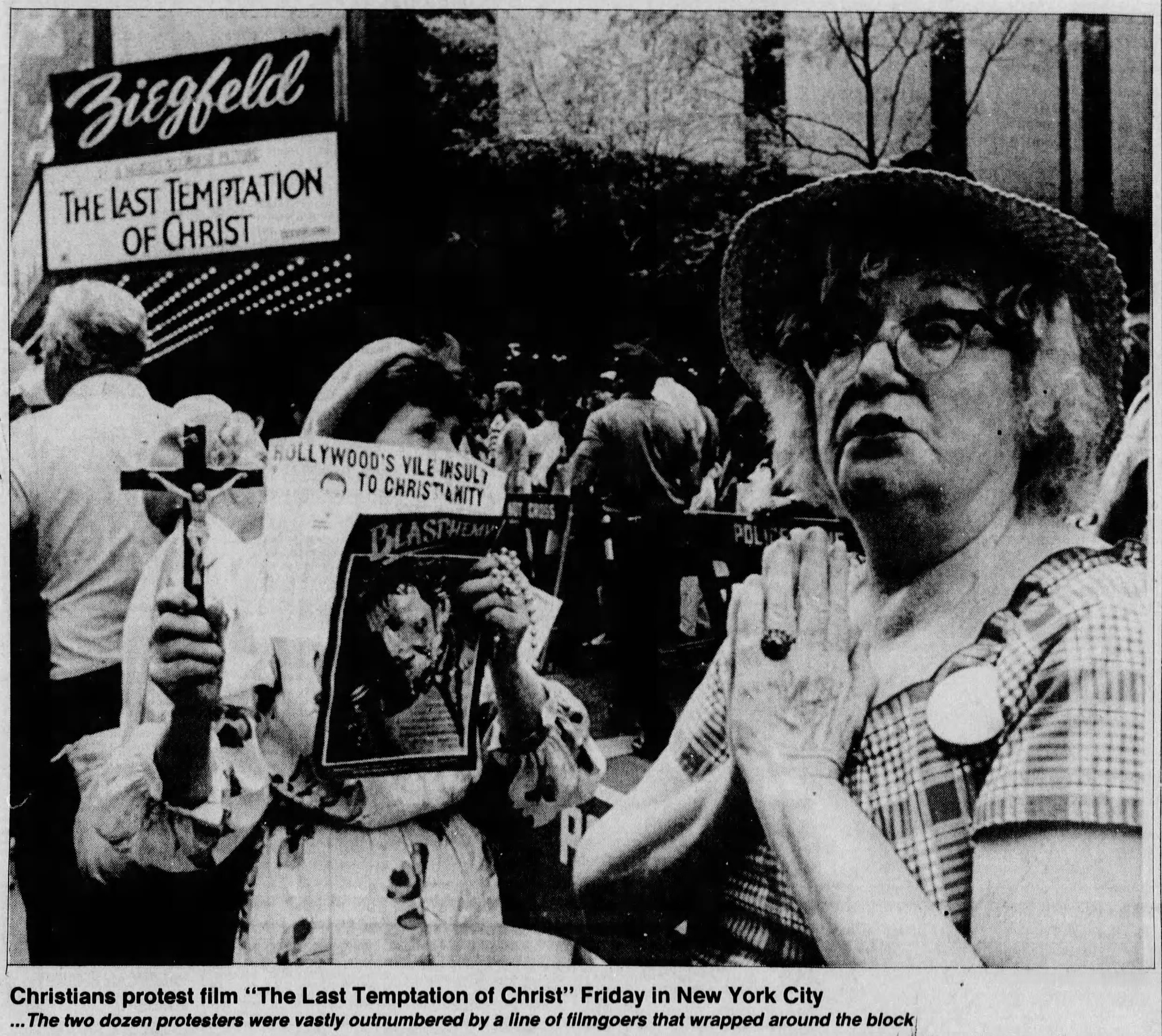
Newspaper clipping from August 1988

Because of the film's departures from the gospel narratives—and especially a brief scene wherein Jesus and Mary Magdalene consummate their marriage—several Christian groups organized vocal protests and boycotts of the film prior to and upon its release. One protest, organized by a religious Californian radio station, gathered 600 protesters to picket the headquarters of Universal Studios' then parent company MCA. One of the protestors dressed up as MCA's chairman Lew Wasserman and pretended to drive nails through Jesus' hands into a wooden cross. Evangelist Bill Bright offered to buy the film's negative from Universal in order to destroy it. The protests were effective in persuading several theater chains not to screen the film. One of those chains, General Cinemas, later apologized to Scorsese for doing so.

=== Censorship and bans ===
Mother Angelica, a Catholic nun and founder of Eternal Word Television Network, described Last Temptation as "the most blasphemous ridicule of the Eucharist that's ever been perpetrated in this world" and "a holocaust movie that has the power to destroy souls eternally." In some countries, including Greece, South Africa, Turkey, Mexico, Chile and Argentina, the film was banned or censored for several years. As of February 2024, the film continued to be banned in the Philippines and Singapore. In February 2020, Netflix revealed the film to be one of the five titles that have been removed from the Singapore version of Netflix at the demand of the Singapore government's Infocomm Media Development Authority.

== Awards and nominations ==
Award	Category	Nominee(s)	Result
Academy Awards	Best Director	Martin Scorsese	Nominated
Golden Globe Awards	Best Supporting Actress – Motion Picture	Barbara Hershey	Nominated
Golden Globe Awards	Best Original Score – Motion Picture	Peter Gabriel	Nominated
Golden Raspberry Awards	Worst Supporting Actor	Harvey Keitel	Nominated
Grammy Awards	Best Album of Original Instrumental Background Score Written for a Motion Picture or Television	Peter Gabriel	Nominated
Los Angeles Film Critics Association Awards	Best Director	Martin Scorsese	Runner-up
MTV Movie Awards Mexico	Best Miracle in a Movie	Willem Dafoe for "The wine at Caná (Jesus turns water into wine at a wedding)"	Nominated
National Board of Review Awards	Top Ten Films		5th Place
Venice International Film Festival	Filmcritica "Bastone Bianco" Award	Martin Scorsese	Won (Note: Tied with Once More.)

== See also ==
- Sexuality and marital status of Jesus

== Works cited ==
=== Books ===
- Wilson, Michael (2011). Scorsese On Scorsese. Cahiers du Cinéma. ISBN 9782866427023.

=== News ===
- Bergeson, Samantha (May 17, 2023). "Why Martin Scorsese Gave 'Schindler's List' to Steven Spielberg After 'Last Temptation of Christ' Backlash". IndieWire. Archived from the original on March 31, 2025.
- Richlin, Harrison (March 29, 2025). "Martin Scorsese Didn't Believe 'The Last Temptation of Christ' Would 'Ever Get Made' Until Oliver Stone Showed Him Willem Dafoe in 'Platoon'". IndieWire. Archived from the original on March 31, 2025.
