= Abdelkrim Derkaoui =

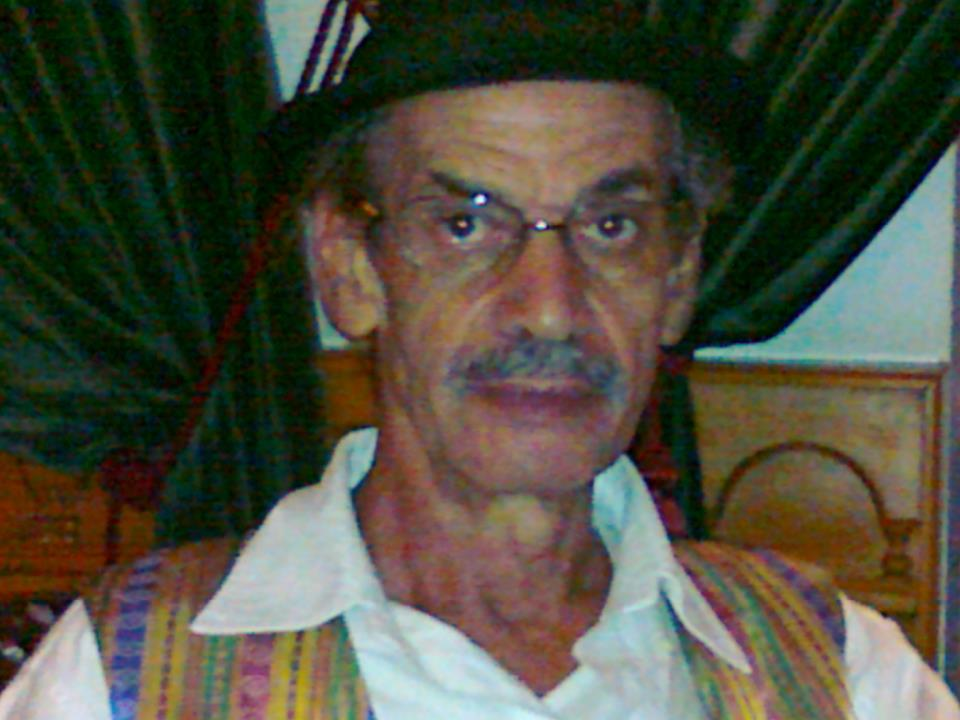
- Abdelkrim Muhammed Derkaoui
- Born: Mohamed Abdelkrim Derkaoui; March 29, 1945 (age 80); Oujda
- Citizenship: Moroccan
- Occupations: director and producer.
- Notable work: Le jour du forain
- Relatives: Mostafa Derkaoui

Mohamed Abdelkrim Derkaoui (born March 29, 1945, in Oujda) is a Moroccan director and producer.

== Biography ==
Derkaoui attended the National Film School in Łódź, Poland, where he graduated in 1972. He is the brother of director Mostafa Derkaoui and the uncle of cinematographer Kamal Derkaoui. Upon his return to Morocco, he became one of the most renowned directors of photography in the profession. As such, he has worked on some thirty feature films, numerous short films and documentaries as well as several TV movies, soap operas and cultural programs.

== Filmography ==
=== Director ===
- 1984: Le jour du forain
- 1998: Rue le Caire
- 2009: Chroniques blanches
- 2010: Les Enfants terribles de Casablanca
- 2014: Les griffes du passé

=== Director of photography ===
- 1974 : About Some Meaningless Events
- 1978 : Les cendres du Clos
- 1979 : Deux moins un
- 1981 : Les beaux jours de Chahrazade
- 1981 : Annoûra ou Le jour du forain
- 1982 : Des pas dans le brouillard
- 1983 : Cauchemar
- 1983 : Titre provisoire
- 1984 : Les Immigrés
- 1989 : Fiction première
  - Un amour à Casablanca
  - Le marteau et l'enclume
- 1990 :La fête des autres
  - Chronique d'une vie normale
- 2008: Itto titrit
