= Ahmed El Maanouni =

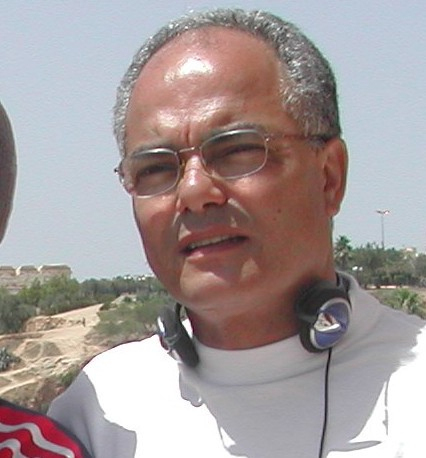
- Ahmed El Maanouni by Karim Ramzi in 2008
- Born: 25 November 1944 (age 81); Casablanca, Morocco
- Occupations: Film director, producer, actor, screenwriter, cinematographer
- Known for: Trances; Alyam, Alyam; Les Coeurs brûlés
- Awards: Winner 1st Film Award at Carthage Film Festival

Ahmed El Maanouni (born in 1944) is a Moroccan screenwriter, film director, cinematographer, actor and producer.

== Career ==
His films include Alyam Alyam (1978), the first Moroccan film to be selected in Cannes Film Festival and winner of the Grand Prize at the Mannheim Film Festival.

He caught international attention when his film Trances was honored and presented by Martin Scorsese at the 2007 Cannes Film Festival to inaugurate the World Cinema Foundation.

His film Les Coeurs brûlés (2007) won the Grand Prize at the National Film Festival and was awarded many international prizes. His documentary films consistently interrogate colonial history and its impact on Moroccan memory.

He directs study groups and educational programs in Morocco and throughout the world. In 2007, he was honored with the title of Officier of the Ordre des Arts et des Lettres in France.

== Filmography ==
=== Film ===
Year	Title	Credited as				Notes
Year	Title	Director	Screenwriter	Producer	Cinematographer	Notes
1978	Alyam, Alyam	Yes	Yes	Yes	Yes	
1978	A Breach in the Wall	No	No	No	Yes	directed by Jillali Ferhati
1981	Trances	Yes	Yes	No	Yes	Documentary film
1982	Queen Lear	No	No	No	Yes	directed by Mokhtar Chorfi
1982	Illusions	No	No	No	Yes	directed by Julie Dash
1984	Les yeux du golfe	Yes	Yes	No	No	Documentary short film
1993	Moroccan Goumiers	Yes	Yes	No	No	
2006	La Fiction du Protectorat: Maroc-France, une Histoire Commune Part 1	Yes	Yes	Yes	No	Documentary film
2007	Les coeurs brûlés	Yes	Yes	Yes	No	
2016	Julie-Aicha	Yes	Yes	No	No	

=== Actor ===
- L'Année sainte (1976), directed by Jean Girault
- Les Anges de Satan (2007), directed by Ahmed Boulane
- Le Retour du Fils (2012), directed by Ahmed Boulane

== Awards ==
- 1978 : Alyam, Alyam : official selection 1978 Cannes Film Festival
- Grand prize 1978 Mannheim-Heidelberg International Film Festival
- Winner 1st Film Award at Carthage Film Festival
- Winner 7th Art Award at Fespaco
- CICAE prize at Taormina Film Fest
- Jury Prize at Festival international du film francophone de Namur
- Critics Prize at Damascus International Film Festival
- 1981 : Trances : 1st ESEC Prize 1981 Cannes Film Festival,
- Audience Award at National Film Festival Rabat 1982,
- First film to be restored by the World Cinema Foundation and presented by Martin Scorsese at Cannes Classics 2007
- 2007 : Burned Hearts : Grand Prize 2007 National Film Festival Tangiers,
- Critics Award 2007 National Film Festival Tangiers,
- Best Sound Award 2007 National Film Festival Tangiers,
- Best Cinematography Award 2007 at Dubai International Film Festival,
- Best Director Award 2008 Oran Film Festival,
- Bronze Award 2008 Damascus International Film Festival,
- Special Jury Prize and Audience Award 2008 at Tetouan Mediterranean Cinema Festival.
