= Alyam, Alyam =

1978 film

Alyam Alyam O les jours
- Directed by: Ahmed El Maanouni
- Screenplay by: Ahmed El Maanouni
- Produced by: Ahmed El Maanouni; Rabii Films Productions
- Starring: Abdelwahad y familia Tobi; Afandi Redouane; Ben Brahim
- Cinematography: Ahmed El Maanouni
- Edited by: Martine Chicot
- Music by: Nass El Ghiwane
- Production company: Mars / Lux Films
- Distributed by: Africa Film Library
- Release date: 1978
- Running time: 90 minutes
- Country: Morocco
- Languages: Arabic with English and French subtitles

Alyam Alyam O les jours, a.k.a. Oh the Days!, is a 1978 Moroccan drama film.

== Synopsis ==
Following his father's death, Abdelwahad, a young man, has to take his place as head of the family. His presence is crucial to the family unit, especially as he has to provide for his seven brothers. Hlima, his mother and a woman of exemplary strength and nature, also fully plays her role. When Abdelwahad tells her that he wishes to leave to work in France, she tries to talk him out of it. He no longer can bear the life of young people in the countryside. He refuses to be a poor man without a future and applies for a work permit in France.

== Awards ==
- Grand prize 1978 Mannheim-Heidelberg International Film Festival
- Taormina 1978
- FESPACO 1979
- CICAE
- Cartago
- Damasco
- FIFEF
