= Peter Murphy (executive) =

American businessman (born 1962)

- Born: Peter E Murphy; 1962 (age 63–64); Massachusetts
- Occupation: Entertainment executive
- Years active: 1988–present

Peter E Murphy (born 1962) is an American businessman and founder of Wentworth Capital Management. He was chief strategic officer of Disney and President, Strategy & Development of Caesars Entertainment Corporation.

== Current ==
Peter E. Murphy is the founder of Wentworth Capital Management, a private investment and venture capital firm focused on media, technology, and branded consumer businesses. Wentworth advises and invests in early and late stage growth businesses in digital media, television, and entertainment. Murphy also serves on the Board of Directors of various media and digital companies, including Tribune Company (Nasdaq: TRBAA) serving as chairman of the audit committee, Revel Entertainment, where he serves as the chairman of the board, and Malibu Boats (Nasdaq: MBUU) where he serves as chairman of the compensation committee. Previously, Murphy served on the Board of Directors for Fisher Communications (Nasdaq: FSCI) and Dial Global (Nasdaq: DG).

== Apollo and Caesars Entertainment ==
From 2009-2011, Murphy served as President, Strategy & Development of Caesars Entertainment, an Apollo-TPG portfolio company and the world’s largest gaming company. He was responsible for corporate strategy and growth, mergers & acquisitions, corporate development, and real estate development around the world. Prior to Caesars, Murphy was an operating partner at the private equity firm Apollo Global Management focused on media and entertainment investing.

== Disney ==
Murphy spent 18 years at The Walt Disney Company (Nasdaq: DIS) in senior executive roles, serving as Disney’s senior executive vice president, chief strategic officer, senior advisor to the CEO, a member of the company's executive management committee, and CFO of ABC, Inc. He was responsible for strategy, new business development, mergers and acquisitions, technology, brand management, and long term planning for the growth of Disney's global businesses. The "Strategic Planning" department he headed was reviled by other Disney employees and was blamed by some for supposed missteps Disney took towards the end of the Eisner era. During his tenure the company grew from ~$5 billion in revenue to over $35 billion, driven by the acquisition of Capital Cities/ABC which Murphy spearheaded. Other high-profile acquisitions he led include Miramax Film Corp, Fox Family Worldwide and The Muppets. He was recognized by The Hollywood Reporter in their “Next Generation: Hollywood’s Top 35 Executives under 35” list and lectures regularly at the Tuck School of Business at Dartmouth.

== Education ==
Peter Murphy has a bachelor's degree from Dartmouth College where he graduated Phi Beta Kappa and Magna Cum Laude, and an MBA from the University of Pennsylvania Wharton School of Business.
